= Coraid, Inc. =

Computer data storage vendor

- Type: Private
- Industry: Data Storage
- Founded: 2000
- Founder: Brantley Coile
- Headquarters: Athens, Georgia, U.S.
- Key people: CEO: Brantley Coile
- Products: EtherDrive SRX, EtherDrive VSX, EtherFlash, EtherCloud, NAS, AoE, SAN

Coraid, Inc. is a computer data storage vendor that provides storage area network (SAN) products that use Ethernet, headquartered in Athens, Georgia.

== History ==
The company was founded by Brantley Coile, who previously worked on the Cisco PIX firewall and Cisco LocalDirector products. Coile began the research and development phase of the company in 2000 after leaving Cisco Systems, and developed the ATA over Ethernet (AoE) protocol, which enables storage networking using raw Ethernet frames for transport.

The company began selling its EtherDrive family of storage arrays in 2004. The open AoE protocol was released to the Linux community, and included in the Linux kernel since 2005, starting with version 2.6.11.

Coraid was backed with a total of $114.3 million in funding. The company received a first, $10 million round of institutional financing from two venture capital funds in January 2010, at the same time introducing new management and an advisory board. The company also moved its headquarters to Redwood City, CA early in 2010. Coraid secured an additional $25 million in Series B funding in November 2010, followed by a third round of $50M in November 2011. In December 2013 the company received its final round of $29.3M.

The company website said they had more than 1,700 customers in sectors including media, hosting service providers, telecommunications, healthcare, aerospace, manufacturing, and government.

In January 2015, CEO Dave Kresse acknowledged a funding shortfall.

On January 14, 2015, all employees were terminated abruptly, given their final paychecks with no severance.

In May 2015, The Brantley Coile Company bought all the EtherDrive SRX and VSX assets.

In August 2016, SouthSuite acquired the Coraid trademark.

Coraid hardware and software products, VSX and SRX started shipping again in 2017.
