= Digital Media Port =

The Digital Media Port (DMP or DMPort) is an interface for analog audio and video signal and digital control that Sony has started to propose on its A/V products in 2007. As of January 2009, Sony seems to be the only manufacturer proposing this interface. They offer different accessories to connect DMP ready equipment like their Bravia TV or Home Theater receivers to Walkman, iPod, PC or any Bluetooth devices.

The connector of this port is Hirose ST60-18P(50).

== Pinout ==
The following pinout is an excerpt from STR-DA3400ES service manual.

Signal Name	Pin Number
PGND	1
VBUS(5V)	2
NC	3
VIDEO5V	4
RXD	5
TXD	6
DET	7
DGND	8
WM DET	9
WM A/D	10
L-	11
R-	12
L+	13
R+	14
WM RX	15
WM TX	16
VIDEO	17
VGND	18
