= Flexible flat cable =

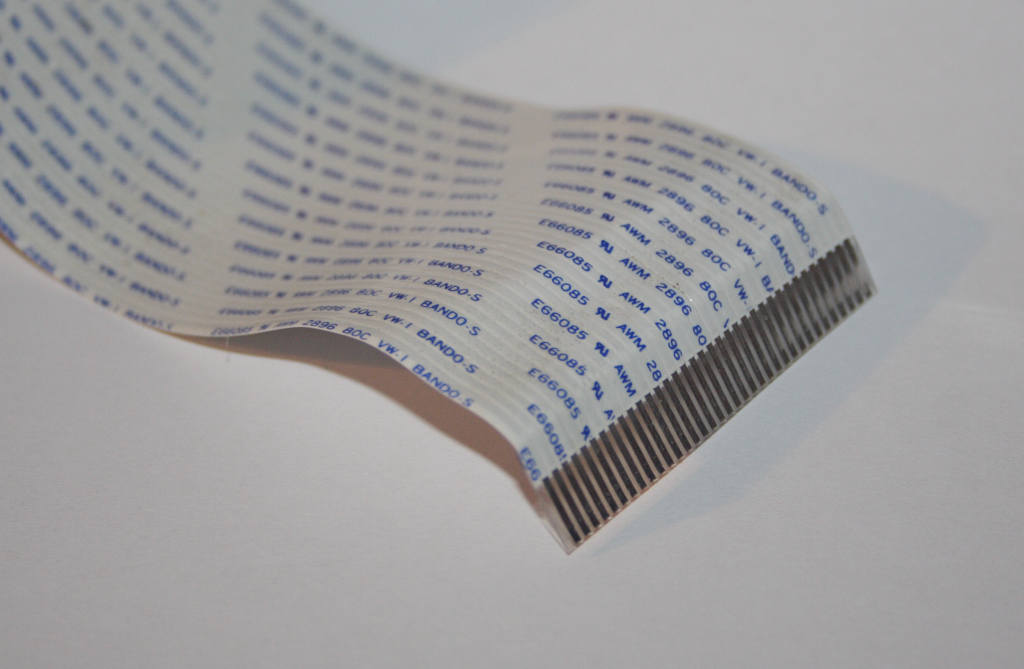
35-conductor flexible flat cable

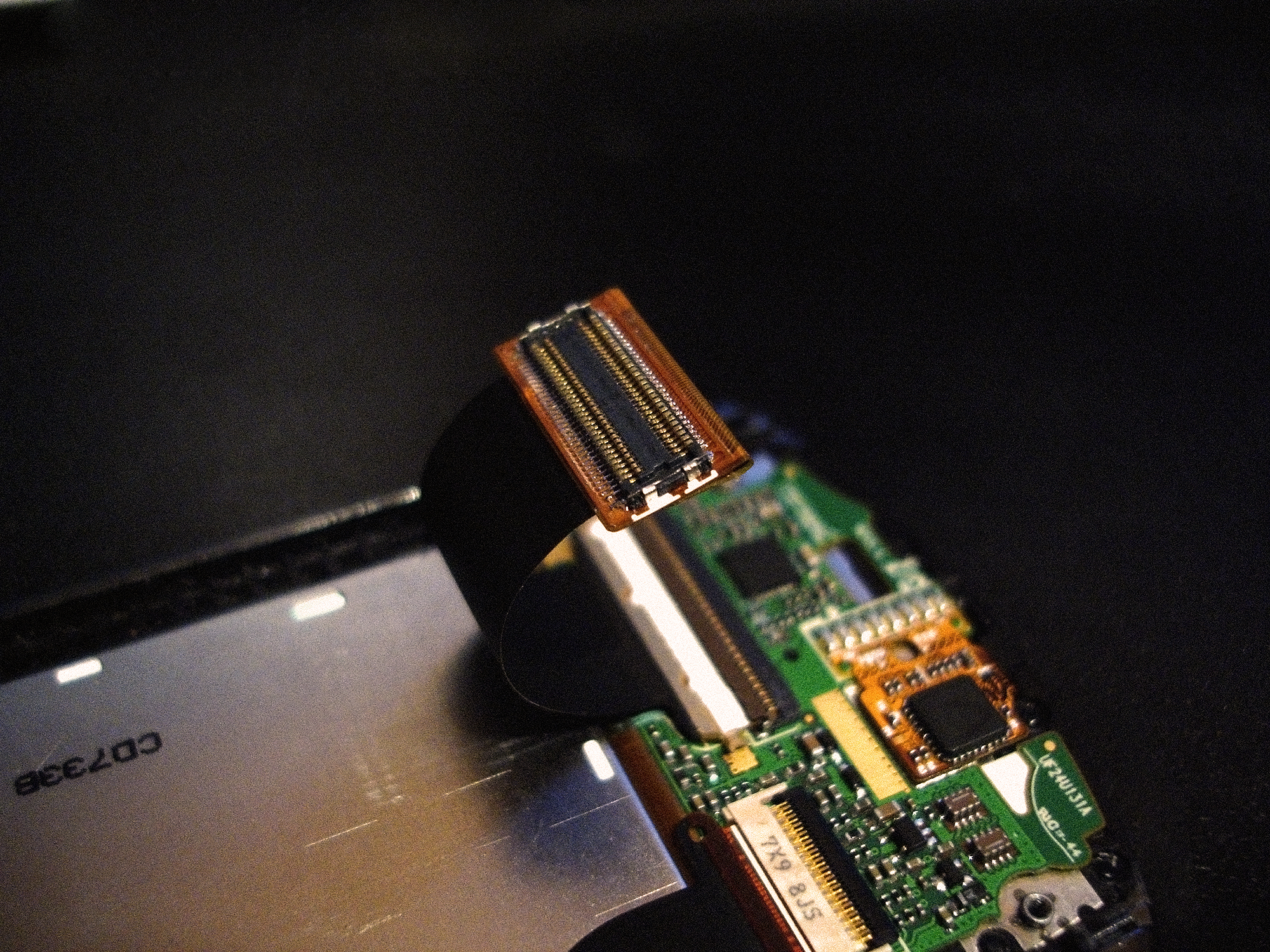
FFC including connectors, used in the Samsung SGH-U700 mobile phone

Flat Flexible Cable (FFC) refers to any variety of electrical cable that is both flat and flexible, with flat solid conductors. A flexible flat cable is a type of flexible electronics. However, the term FFC usually refers to the extremely thin flat cable often found in high-density electronic applications like laptops and cell phones.

== Overview ==
Sometimes the term FPC (flexible printed circuit) is even—somewhat inaccurately—used for any type of FFC; however, this is more accurately used to describe etched or printed circuits that incorporate components and are built onto a flexible material. FFCs are usually straight connections without any components.

FFC is thinner than ribbon cable, which is also flat and flexible but uses round conductors. The cable usually consists of a flat, flexible plastic film base with multiple flat metallic conductors bonded to one surface. Often, each end of the cable is reinforced with a stiffener to make insertion easier or to provide strain relief. The stiffener makes the end of the cable slightly thicker.

Flexible flat cables are used instead of round cables for easy cable management, especially in high-flex applications. They usually take up less space than round cables, often offering better EMI/RFI suppression and eliminating wire-coupling issues. In addition, because the wires are protected individually and not wrapped many times over by different materials as round cables are, they are lighter in weight and offer greater flexibility.

== Specifications ==
Number of Conductors (Pins)
This is the total number of conductors within the cable, ranging from just a few to over 100. The conductors are also referred to as "pins." For example, an FFC cable with 20 conductors is called a 20-pin.

Pitch
The spacing of the conductors. The pitch typically refers to the distance from the center of one conductor to the center of its neighboring conductor. A single FFC can have different pitches between different conductors on the same cable, however, this is uncommon. FFC cables are available in many pitches, such as 0.500 mm, 0.625 mm, 0.635 mm, 0.800 mm, 1.00 mm, 1.25 mm, 1.27 mm, 2.00 mm, 2.54 mm, but the most common pitches are 0.500 mm, 1.00 mm, and 1.25 mm. Custom Pitch and Multiple Pitch FFC are available upon special request.

Type
Some cables (described as Type 1 by Würth Elektronik or Type A by Molex) have exposed contacts on the same side at each end. Other cables (labelled Type 2 or Type D) have the exposed contacts on opposite sides of the cable (so that if the cable is lying flat, one end will have face-up contacts, and the other end will have face-down contacts).

Exposure length
The length of the electrical contact that has been exposed at the termination of the cable.

Stiffener
Most FFCs have some sort of extra material attached on the opposite side of the exposed length of the cable to facilitate ZIF or LIF connections.

Conductors size
The width and thickness of the conductors.

FFC Cables are widely used in printer connections between the head and the motherboard, plotters, scanners, copiers, stereos, LCD appliances, fax machines, DVD players, and signal transmission and plate board connections. In modern electrical equipment, FFC cables can be found almost everywhere.

== See also ==
- Zero insertion force
