= Zero insertion force =

Electrical socket

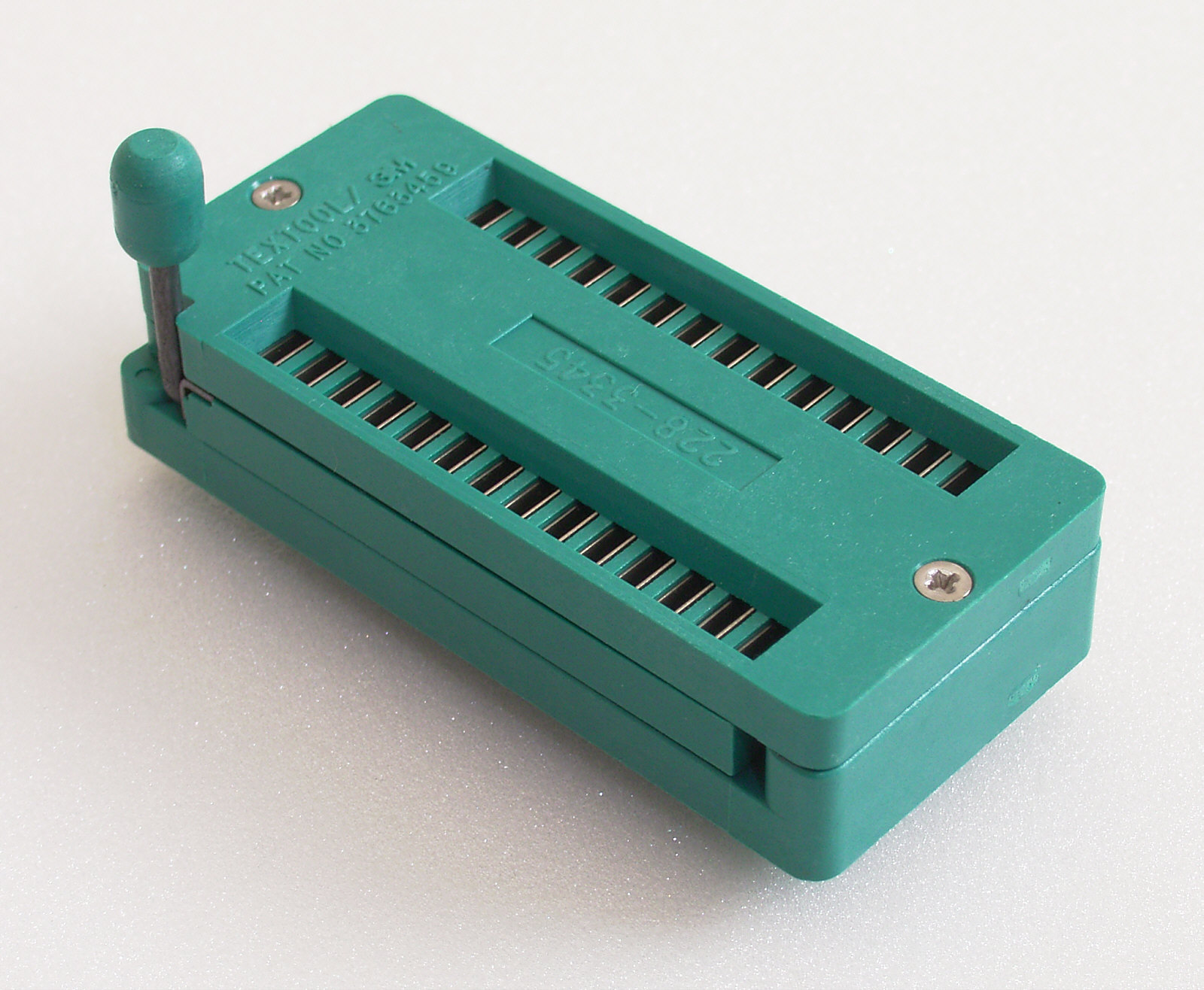
ZIF socket for DIP-28W package

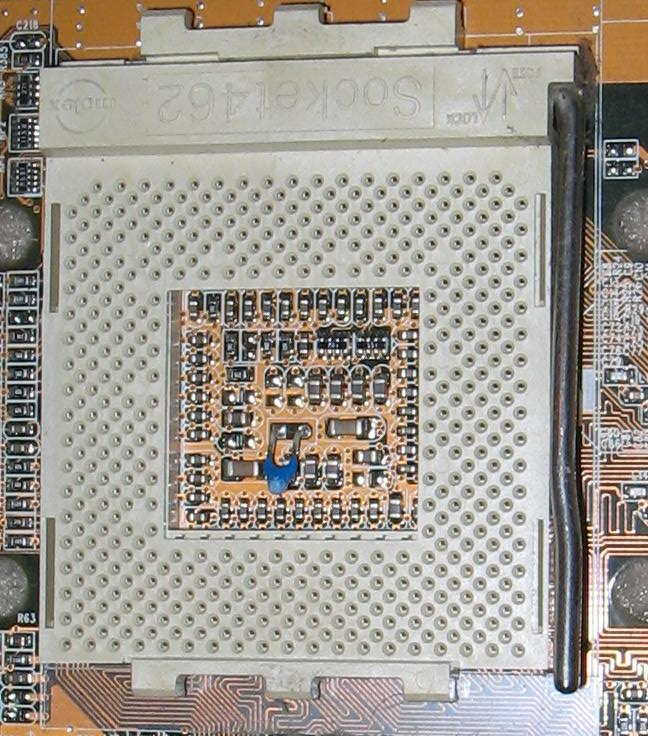
A large ZIF socket (Socket A)

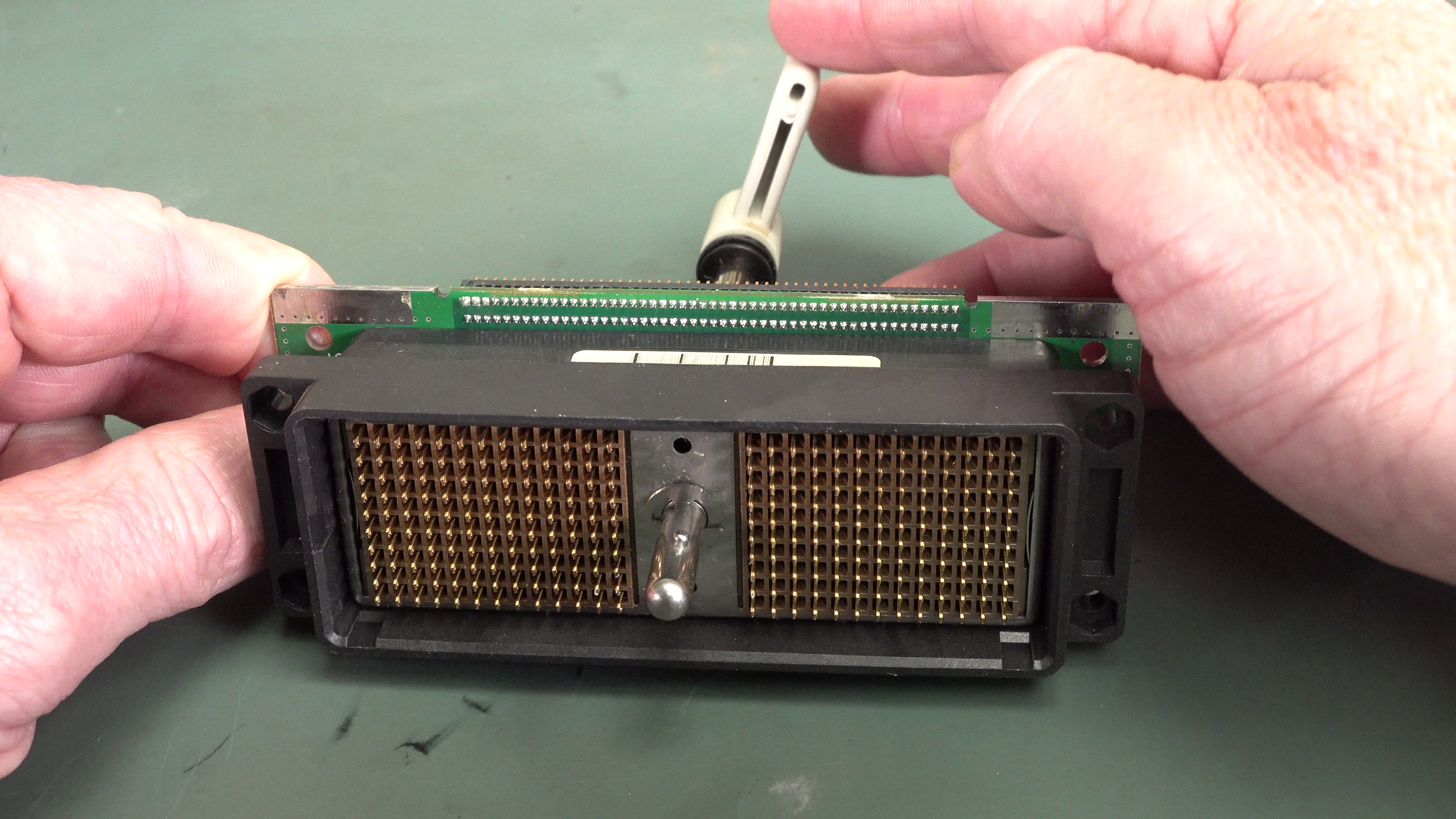
Zero insertion force connector from a Philips C5-2 ultrasound probe

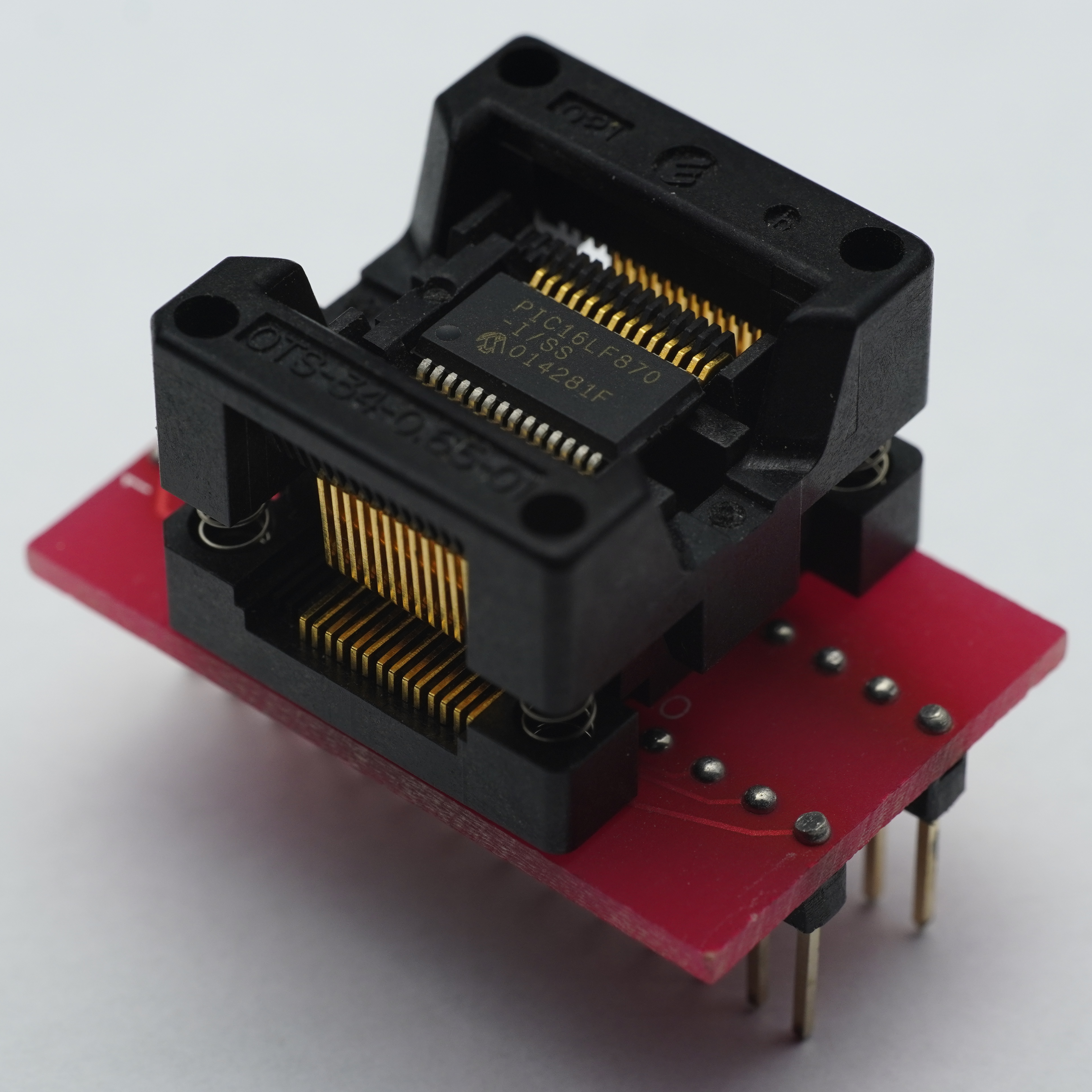
A PIC microcontroller (wide SOIC-28) in a ZIF socket

Zero insertion force (ZIF) is a type of IC socket or electrical connector that requires very little (but not literally zero) force for insertion. With a ZIF socket, before the IC is inserted, a lever or slider on the side of the socket is moved, pushing all the sprung contacts apart so that the IC can be inserted with very little force - generally the weight of the IC itself is sufficient and no external downward force is required. The lever is then moved back, allowing the contacts to close and grip the pins of the IC. ZIF sockets are much more expensive than standard IC sockets and also tend to take up a larger board area due to the space taken up by the lever mechanism. Typically, they are only used when there is a specific need for them, such as an EPROM programmer, for prototyping work or for some large processor chips where non-ZIF sockets are impractical.

== Design ==
Demonstration of a PGA-ZIF socket (AMD 754)

A normal integrated circuit (IC) socket requires the IC to be pushed into sprung contacts which then grip by friction. For an IC with hundreds of pins, the total insertion force can be very large (hundreds of newtons), leading to a danger of damage to the device or the circuit board. Also, even with relatively small pin counts, each pin extraction is fairly awkward and carries a significant risk of bending pins, particularly if the person performing the extraction hasn't had much practice or if the board is crowded. Low insertion force (LIF) sockets reduce the issues of insertion and extraction, but because of its lower insertion force than a conventional socket, are likely to produce less reliable connections.

Large ZIF sockets are only commonly found mounted on PC motherboards, being used from about the mid 1990s forward. These CPU sockets are designed to support a particular range of CPUs, allowing computer retailers and consumers to assemble motherboard/CPU combinations based on individual budgets and requirements. The rest of the electronics industry has largely abandoned sockets (of any kind) and instead moved to the use of surface mount components soldered directly to the board.

Smaller ZIF sockets are commonly used in chip-testing and programming equipment, e.g., programming and testing on EEPROMs, Microcontrollers, etc.

== Universal test sockets ==
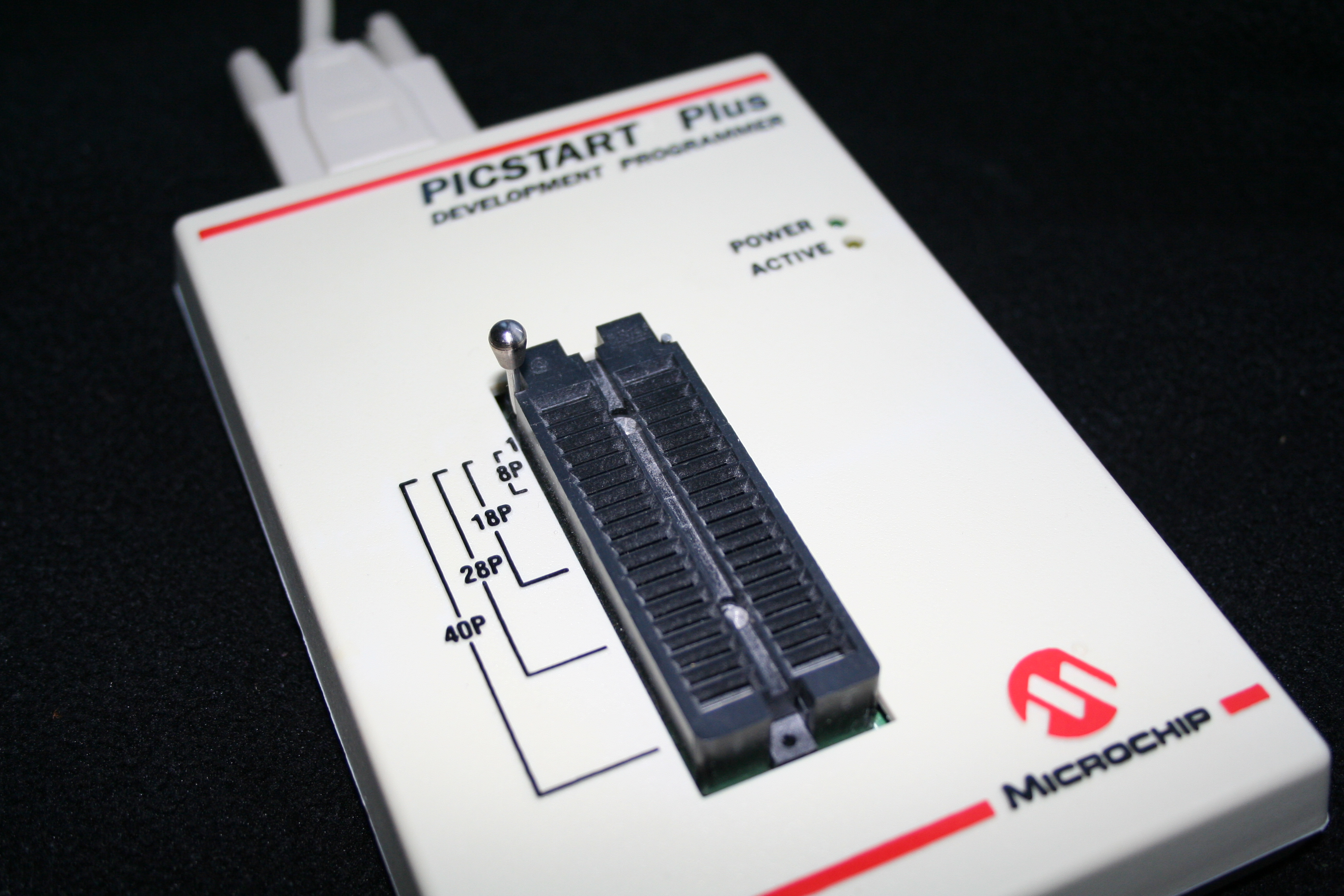
Programming device for a PIC microcontroller, with a dual in-line ZIF socket

Standard DIP packages come in a number of widths (measured between pin centers), with 0.3 in (7.62 mm) and 0.6 in (15.24 mm) being the most common. To allow the design of programmers and similar devices that support a range of devices universal test sockets are produced. These have wide slots into which the pins drop allowing devices of differing widths to be inserted.

== Ball grid array sockets ==
ZIF sockets can be used for ball grid array chips, particularly during development. These sockets tend to be unreliable, failing to grab all the solder balls. Another type of BGA socket, also free of insertion force but not a "ZIF socket" in the traditional sense, does a better job by using spring pins to push up underneath the balls.

== ZIF wire-to-board connectors ==
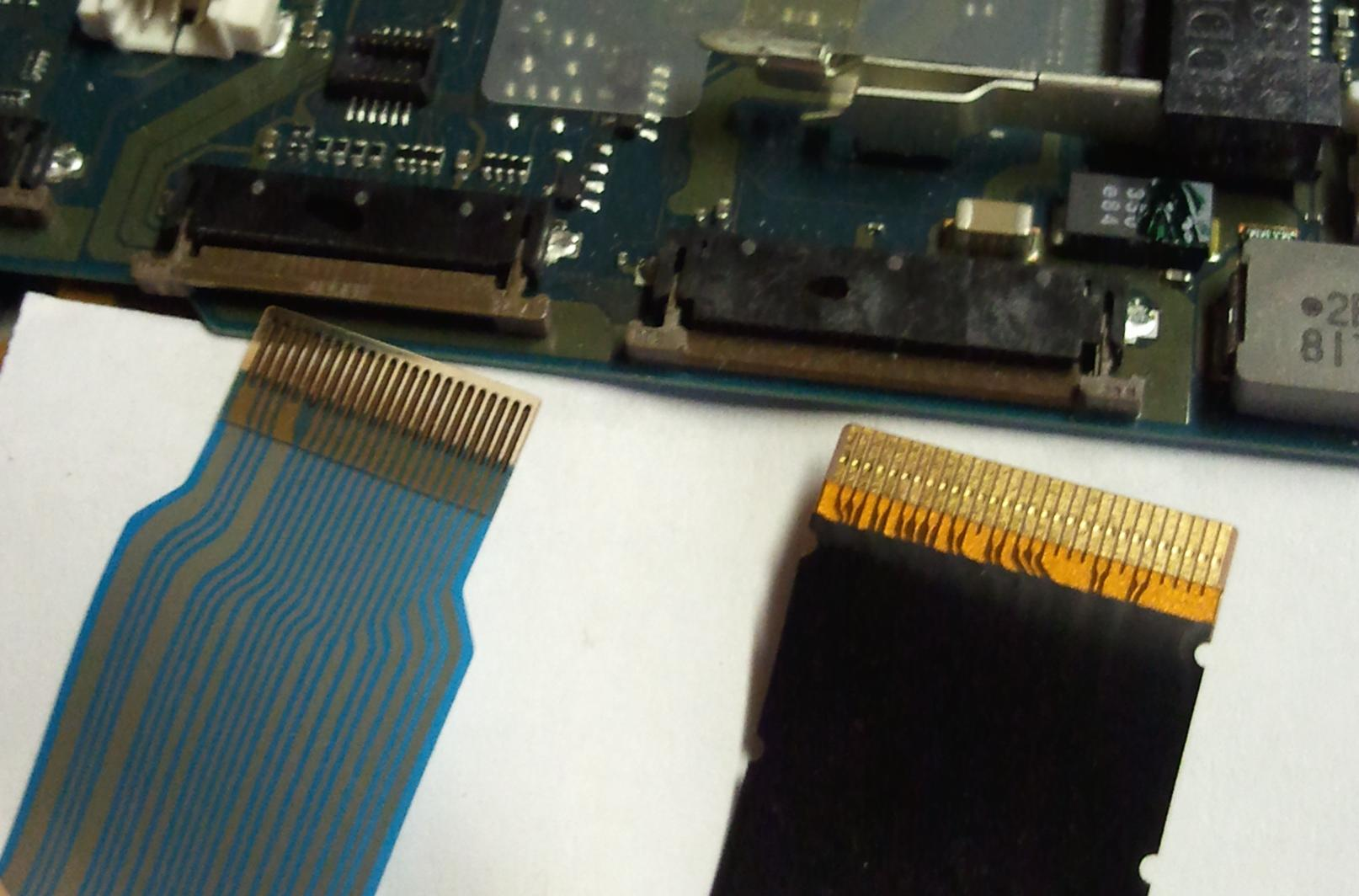
A pair of ZIF connectors, with the flexible flat cable that connects to them

ZIF wire-to-board connectors are used for attaching wires to printed circuit boards inside electronic equipment. An example would be the cable between the LCD screen and motherboard in laptops. The wires, often formed into a ribbon cable, are pre-stripped and the bare ends are placed inside the connector. The two sliding parts of the connector are then pushed together, causing it to grip the wires. The most important advantage of this system is that it does not require a mating half to be fitted to the wire ends, therefore saving space and cost inside miniaturised equipment. See flexible flat cable.

== Hard disk drives ==
ZIF tape connections are used for connecting Parallel ATA and Serial ATA disk drives (mostly drives in the 1.8-inch form factor). PATA hard drives with ZIF-style connectors were used primarily in the design of ultra-portable notebooks. They have since been phased out, as SATA has a relatively small-form-factor connector by default. M.2 (or mSATA in older machines) used where even smaller form factors are required.

Internally, nearly all hard drives use ZIF tape to connect their circuit board to their platter motor. ZIF tape connections were also heavily used in the design of the iPod range of portable media players, not just for the hard drive but also for other connections from the main circuit board. Three types of ZIF connectors are known to exist on 1.8 inch PATA drives. ZIF-24, ZIF-40, and ZIF-50 have 24, 40, and 50 pins respectively.

== See also ==
- Dual in-line package
- Flexible flat cable
