= Pharsalia Technologies =

Software company in Georgia, US, 1999–2000

Pharsalia Technologies, Inc.
- Pharsalia Technologies Logo
- Industry: Systems and Information Management
- Founded: December 1999
- Website: pharsalia.com

Pharsalia Technologies, Inc. was founded in December 1999, located in Roswell, Georgia, as an emerging company developing network infrastructure products for the Internet market. Led by a team of over 28 software engineers, Pharsalia focused on developing software products for the rapidly escalating content delivery market. The company was headed by Chip Howes, whose team is the inventor of record for over 30 patents in the area of TCP/IP server load balancing, and are credited with the invention of the technology in 1996.

Pharsalia was acquired by Alteon WebSystems of San Jose, California on July 21, 2000 in a stock swap worth about $221 million. Subsequently, Alteon was acquired by Nortel Networks on October 4, 2000.

After integrating the company into Nortel Networks, most of the original team was laid off by August 2003. The founders went on to start another company, Steelbox Networks, and hired back many of the same engineers.

== Trivia ==
Pharsalia is a name related to the location of Julius Caesar's victory over Pompey. Pharsalia Technologies was named after Pharsalia Plantation in Massies Mill, VA, the birthplace of Sarah Howes, mother of founder, Chip Howes.
