= Brantley Coile =

American businessman and computer programmer

Brantley Coile is an inventor and founder of network technology companies, he worked for John Mayes as a programmer whose companies products include PIX Firewall, the first stateful-inspection firewall and Cisco Systems' first load-balancer, LocalDirector. Coile's patents include the fundamental patents on Network Address Translation (NAT).

Coile earned a degree in computer science at the University of Georgia. In 1994, he co-founded Network Translation, where he created the PIX Firewall appliance a new class of data communication firewalls utilizing stateful packet inspection.

After leaving Cisco Systems in 2000, he founded Coraid, Inc. to design and develop network storage devices using the ATA over Ethernet (AoE), an open and lightweight network storage protocol.

Coile founded South Suite, Inc. in 2013 and continued to develop AoE technology. In 2015 he purchased Coraid's EtherDrive intellectual property and founded The Brantley Coile Company, a subsidiary of SouthSuite.
