= Steelbox Networks =

Steelbox Networks, Inc.
- Company type: Private
- Industry: Video surveillance
- Founded: 2003
- Headquarters: Atlanta, Georgia, United States
- Products: Digital Matrix Switch, Network-Attached Storage
- Number of employees: ~50 (2007)
- Website: www.steelbox.com

Steelbox Networks Inc. was a privately owned company that engineered devices to distribute, store and retrieve large amounts of video data across IP networks. The company was noted for revolutionizing the video surveillance industry through the development of a specialized digital operating system (RTIK) addressing specific needs of video security networks such as problems with large scale storage and playback control. The technology provides secure paths to distribute, store and playback large amounts of live and recorded video. Its primary customer base was businesses and organizations that use video monitoring systems, such as law enforcement, military and transportation.

== Corporate history ==
Steelbox was founded in 2003 in Atlanta, Georgia by six engineers most of whom have worked together for 20 years and completed projects for Cisco Systems, Scientific Atlanta and Nortel Networks. The core team developed the operating system behind the Cisco PIX Firewall, which is widely used throughout the world today. The team also developed the concept of load balancing, a technology that speeds up the flow of information over the Internet by determining the best way to route data requests to the most appropriate sources. Prior to Steelbox, the founders worked for Pharsalia Technologies, which was led by Steelbox CEO, Richard "Chip" Howes. Howes holds 30 patents for designs related to securing and speeding the flow of information over the Internet.

The founders of Steelbox were Richard "Chip" Howes, Bill LeBlanc, Jim Jordan, Tom Bohannon, Scott Higgins, and Bill Vaughan. Its customers included the UK Highways Agency, the Moscow Metro, National Roads Telecommunication Services, and Port of Oostende, Belgium Products/ Solutions.

Steelbox went out of business in 2008.
