= Cisco LocalDirector =

Cisco LocalDirector was a server load balancing appliance, discontinued in 2003, based on the Network Address Translation (NAT) technology Cisco Systems acquired when they bought Network Translation, Inc. The LocalDirector was conceived by John Mayes & Robert Andrews in late 1995 during a pre-acquisition meeting with Robert, Webmaster at Netscape Communications Corporation. During the meeting, Robert Andrews told John Mayes that there were, "probably 10 customers in the world with a load balancing problem". Because of this, the decision was made to begin development on the LocalDirector.

Brantley Coile, who had written the code for the PIX firewall for NTI and later Cisco, started coding of the LocalDirector very shortly after this meeting. As a result of the NTI acquisition by Cisco Systems in late 1995, Brantley hired a team of four long-time associates who were developers: Richard Howes, now at Steelbox Networks, and Pete Tenereillo worked for NTI prior to the Cisco acquisition, and Jim Jordan and Tom Bohannon, also at SteelBox, were hired immediately after the acquisition. Together the four developed the code for the Finesse OS and LocalDirector (Finesse was also used in the Cisco version of the PIX). The majority of the LocalDirector code was shared with the early PIXes.

Though F5 and Cisco started development of a load balancing product around the same time, F5 needed to re-staff and re-develop after the first attempt. The LocalDirector was the industry's first load balancer. It first shipped to a customer in April 1996, only four months after development started, beating the next earliest competitors, F5 and HydraWeb, to market by a full year.

Load balancing provides three important functions. It provides server availability, server scalability and the ability to manage server by bringing them on and off line.

All LocalDirector models were built with Intel-based/Intel-compatible motherboards, along with Intel and Digital network chipsets. The LocalDirector utilizes a proprietary operating system that Cisco calls Finesse. The PIX firewall today uses a derivative of the same operating system. All systems boot from flash memory.

== History and hardware/software specifications ==
| Model | LocalDirector 47-3158-01 | 410 | 415 / CA-LDIR | 416 | 417 | 417G | 420 | 430 |
|---|---|---|---|---|---|---|---|---|
| Introduced | 2Q96 | 1997 | ? | 1999 | ? | ? | 1998 | 1999 |
| Discontinued | ? | ? | 1998 | 2002 | 2003 | 2003 | ? | 2002 |
| CPU type | Intel Pentium | Intel Pentium Pro | Intel Pentium Pro | Intel Celeron (SL3BA) | Intel Pentium III | Intel Pentium III | Intel Pentium II | Intel Pentium II |
| CPU speed | 133 MHz | 166 MHz | 200 MHz | 433 MHz | 600 MHz | 600 MHz | 300 MHz | 450 MHz |
| Chipset | Intel 430HX | Intel 440GX | Intel 440FX | Intel 440BX | ? | ? | Intel 440BX | Intel 440BX |
| Default RAM | 16 MB | 32 MB | 32 MB | 32 MB | 512 MB | 512 MB | 128 MB | 384 MB |
| Boot flash device | Daughtercard | Daughtercard | Daughtercard | Daughtercard | Onboard | Onboard | Daughtercard | Daughtercard |
| Default flash | 2 MB | 2 MB | 2 MB | 2/4 MB | 16 MB | 16 MB | 2 MB | 2/4 MB |
| Default interfaces | 2 | ? | ? | Three LD-FE | ? | ? | Three LD-FE | One LD-QUADFE |
| Max interfaces | 4 | ? | ? | ? | ? | ? | ? | ? |
| Fixed interfaces | No | No | No | No | Six 10/100 Ethernet | Two 1000BASE-SX and two 10/100 Ethernet | No | No |
| Expansion cards supported | ? | ? | ? | ? | ? | ? | ? | ? |
| Floppy drive | Yes | Yes | Yes | Yes | Some | No | Yes | Yes |
| Failover supported | Yes | Yes | Yes | Yes | Yes | Yes | Yes | Yes |
| Model | | 410 | 415 | 416 | 417 | 417G | 420 | 430 |

== List of PCI and ISA expansion cards for the LocalDirector ==
- Flash Memory cards
  - LDIR-2MB-Flash - 2MB ISA flash memory card for all LocalDirectors except the 417/417G. Identical to the 2MB flash card used in early PIXes.

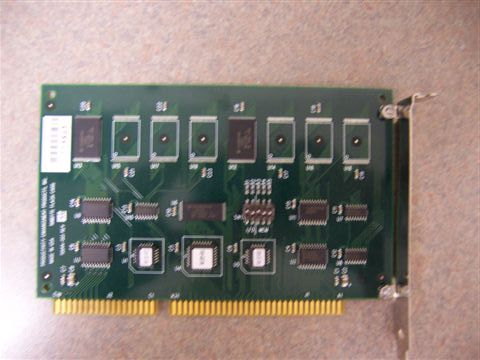
PEP 4MB card

  - PEP upgrade card - 4MB ISA flash upgrade card for the LD 416/430, so named because it, like all of the flash cards used in the PIX/LocalDirector/SSG6510 devices, was manufactured by Productivity Enhancement Products, or PEP. Uses two AMD AM29F016D chips for flash memory, and the BIOS resides on an AMD AM29F010b chip. Description printed on the card itself indicates that it was designed as a 16MB flash card, but six of the eight possible locations silkscreened on the PCB for the 29F016D chips are not populated. It is not comparable to any card used in the PIX, nor does the PIX OS recognize its flash chips. Mentioned in the 3.2 release notes .
- Network interface cards
  - LD-FDDI - 32 bit/33 MHz dual port PCI FDDI card based on the Interphase 5511 FDDI card (PB05511-002).
  - LD-FE - 32 bit/33 MHz single port 10/100 Fast Ethernet card. Based variously on the Intel 82557, 82558, or 82559 chipsets.
  - LD-GE - PCI Gigabit Ethernet (1000BASE-SX) PCI card. Based on the Intel 82542 chipset. Does not support autonegotiation of speed or duplex. Identical to the PIX expansion card, the PIX-1GE. Mentioned in the version 3.2.1 installation guide .
  - LD-QUADFE - 32 bit/33 MHz Four port 10/100 Fast Ethernet card. This Osicom-manufactured PCI card came in two varieties. The two kinds can be differentiated visually: when installed in the chassis, the Digital-based card's link speed/activity lights (one amber and one green) are on the left side of the RJ-45 jack, and the Intel card's link speed/activity lights (both green) are on the right side of the RJ-45 jack.
    - One version, identified by the OS as an rns23x0 card, was based on the Digital 21140/21152 chipset, and it did not support autonegotiation of speed or duplex; the part numbers on the card were 2340, 123400-21 and SC401234-25T.
    - The other version, identified by the OS as an i82557 card, was based on the Intel 82558 chipset and was identical to the Cisco PIX expansion card, the PIX-4FE; the part numbers on the card were 124040-01 and either SC402404-25T or SC402404-01T.
  - NI-2FE - PCI dual-port 10/100baseTX Ethernet card.

== See also ==
- Cisco Systems
- Cisco PIX
