= EtherDrive =

Figure 1. Early EtherDrives: (Top) 2.5 PATA Blade (Bottom) 3.5 PATA Blade

Figure 2. SR EtherDrive Cluster These 60 Units can hold over 780 TeraBytes at RAID5 with 60 hot spares.

EtherDrive is a brand name for storage area network devices based upon the ATA over Ethernet (AoE) protocol. It was registered with the United States Patent and Trademark Office in 2004. The word was invented by Brantley Coile as a portmanteau of the words Ethernet and disk drive. EtherDrive was a trademark by Coraid from 2002 until 2015 when it was purchased by The Brantley Coile Company as part of the purchase of Coraid's software copyrights, trademarks and trade secrets in May 2015.

== History ==
The first commercial transaction involving interstate commerce of an EtherDrive branded product was to Geoff Collyer. Some of the first EtherDrive products were embedded Z80 based boards that acted as AoE converters. These boards were attached like a daughterboard to PATA disk drives mounted and connected to a backplane that provided only power and an RJ-45 jack. These original PATA blades were aligned in a single row per shelf and addressed by over Ethernet with a shelf:slot address. The slot component eventually became referred to as a LUN.

Today, EtherDrive devices provide RAID 0, 1, 5, 10, and JBOD. These use AoE to talk to the initiator but provide a hardware RAID close to disk. The device also provides a block scrubbing mechanism called RAIDShield that systematically checks every block on every disk for potential failures. When a bad block is encountered, the block is reconstructed from parity and written to another part of the disk.

EtherDrives have been used as storage for high altitude atmospheric research and aeronautical applications. Combined with SSD disks the technology is an easy solution to data acquisition in the embedded space. Since it uses AoE the device is presented to the host OS as block storage, and thus the EtherDrive requires minimum overhead from the host system.

In April 2015, Coraid was foreclosed on by its creditors. In May 2015, The Brantley Coile Company acquired the trademark and the IP and is now marketing the ATA over Ethernet storage appliance software based on the SRX and VSX products.
