= Low insertion force =

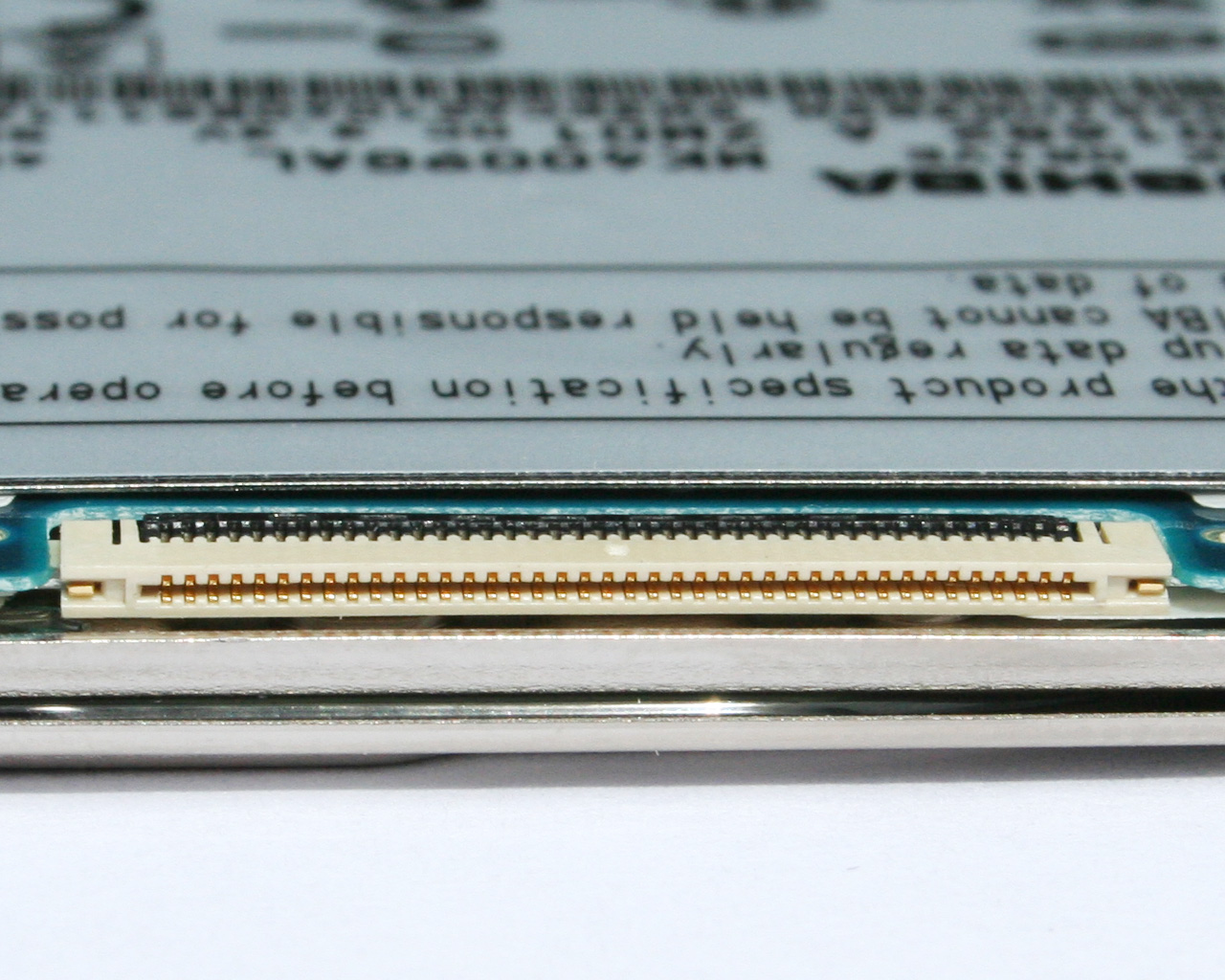
LIF-connector of a 1.8" hard disk drive

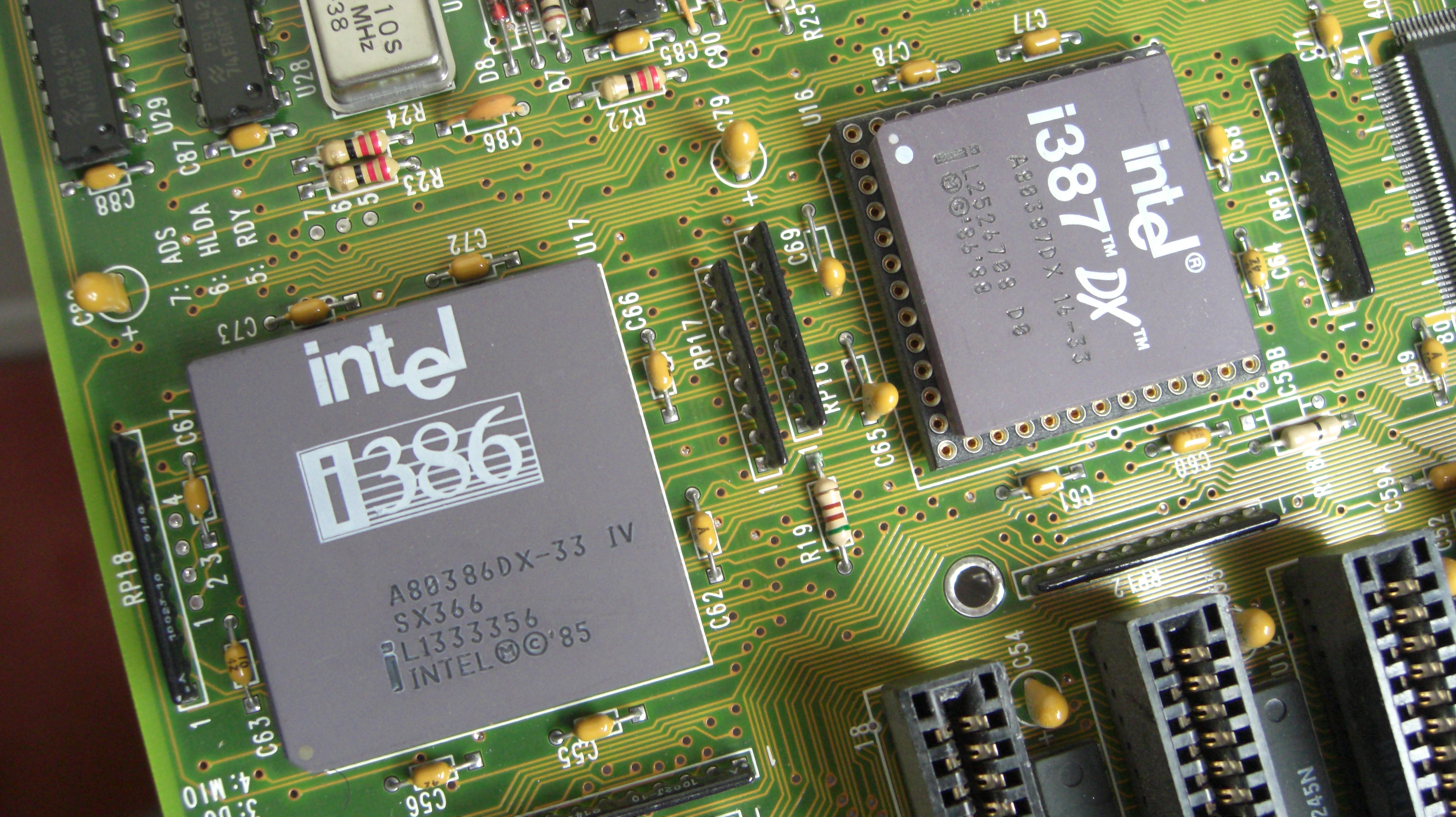
Intel 80386 and 80387 mounted on LIF sockets.

Low insertion force (LIF) is a technology used in integrated circuit sockets that are designed so the force required to insert or remove a package is low.

Initially, the LIF connectors were designed as a cheaper alternative compared to zero insertion force (ZIF) connectors, to facilitate programming and testing of equipment. Compared with standard IC sockets, they achieve a lower friction force between the contacts of the device and the socket, making insertion and removal of the device easier, while at the same time eliminating the need for the complex mechanism that is used in ZIF sockets.

The disadvantages of LIF connectors are that the grip force between the contacts is lower, and the contacts can oxidize faster and decrease the lifespan of the connector. With the advent of frequent changes in PC processors, a need arose for these systems. Intel introduced the LIF socket system, in which the processor is inserted into the socket, rather than fixed by a lever. This type of socket was used for some types of 386s and early 486s. This type of socket has been replaced by the ZIF socket, although LIF sockets are now used in modern 1.8" hard disks.
