= Cisco PIX =

Line of firewall and NAT appliances

Cisco PIX (Private Internet eXchange) was a popular IP firewall and network address translation (NAT) appliance. It was one of the first products in this market segment.

In 2005, Cisco introduced the newer Cisco Adaptive Security Appliance (Cisco ASA), that inherited many of the PIX features, and in 2008 announced PIX end-of-sale.

The PIX technology was sold in a blade, the FireWall Services Module (FWSM), for the Cisco Catalyst 6500 switch series and the 7600 Router series, but has reached end of support status as of September 26, 2007.

== PIX ==
=== History ===
PIX was originally conceived in early 1994 by John Mayes of Redwood City, California and designed and coded by Brantley Coile of Athens, Georgia. The PIX name is derived from its creators' aim of creating the functional equivalent of an IP PBX to solve the then-emerging registered IP address shortage. At a time when NAT was just being investigated as a viable approach, they wanted to conceal a block or blocks of IP addresses behind a single or multiple registered IP addresses, much as PBXs do for internal phone extensions. When they began, RFC 1597 and RFC 1631 were being discussed, but the now-familiar RFC 1918 had not yet been submitted.

The design, and testing were carried out in 1994 by John Mayes, Brantley Coile and Johnson Wu of Network Translation, Inc., with Brantley Coile being the sole software developer. Beta testing of PIX serial number 000000 was completed and first customer acceptance was on December 21, 1994 at KLA Instruments in San Jose, California. The PIX quickly became one of the leading enterprise firewall products and was awarded the Data Communications Magazine "Hot Product of the Year" award in January 1995.

Shortly before Cisco acquired Network Translation in November 1995, Mayes and Coile hired two longtime associates, Richard (Chip) Howes and Pete Tenereillo, and shortly after acquisition 2 more longtime associates, Jim Jordan and Tom Bohannon. Together they continued development on Finesse OS and the original version of the Cisco PIX Firewall, now known as the PIX "Classic". During this time, the PIX shared most of its code with another Cisco product, the LocalDirector.

On January 28, 2008, Cisco announced the end-of-sale and end-of-life dates for all Cisco PIX Security Appliances, software, accessories, and licenses. The last day for purchasing Cisco PIX Security Appliance platforms and bundles was July 28, 2008. The last day to purchase accessories and licenses was January 27, 2009. Cisco ended support for Cisco PIX Security Appliance customers on July 29, 2013.

In May 2005, Cisco introduced the ASA which combines functionality from the PIX, VPN 3000 series and IPS product lines. The ASA series of devices run PIX code 7.0 and later. Through PIX OS release 7.x the PIX and the ASA use the same software images. Beginning with PIX OS version 8.x, the operating system code diverges, with the ASA using a Linux kernel and PIX continuing to use the traditional Finesse/PIX OS combination.

=== Software ===
The PIX runs a custom-written proprietary operating system originally called Finese (Fast Internet Service Executive), but as of 2014 the software is known simply as PIX OS. Though classified as a network-layer firewall with stateful inspection, technically the PIX would more precisely be called a Layer 4, or Transport Layer Firewall, as its access is not restricted to Network Layer routing, but socket-based connections (a port and an IP Address: port communications occur at Layer 4). By default it allows internal connections out (outbound traffic), and only allows inbound traffic that is a response to a valid request or is allowed by an Access Control List (ACL) or by a conduit. Administrators can configure the PIX to perform many functions including network address translation (NAT) and port address translation (PAT), as well as serving as a virtual private network (VPN) endpoint appliance.

The PIX became the first commercially available firewall product to introduce protocol specific filtering with the introduction of the "fixup" command. The PIX "fixup" capability allows the firewall to apply additional security policies to connections identified as using specific protocols. Protocols for which specific fixup behaviors were developed include DNS and SMTP. The DNS fixup originally implemented a very simple but effective security policy; it allowed just one DNS response from a DNS server on the Internet (known as outside interface) for each DNS request from a client on the protected (known as inside) interface. "Inspect" has superseded "fixup" in later versions of PIX OS.

The Cisco PIX was also one of the first commercially available security appliances to incorporate IPSec VPN gateway functionality.

Administrators can manage the PIX via a command line interface (CLI) or via a graphical user interface (GUI). They can access the CLI from the serial console, telnet and SSH. GUI administration originated with version 4.1, and it has been through several incarnations:

- PIX Firewall Manager (PFM) for PIX OS versions 4.x and 5.x, which runs locally on a Windows NT client
- PIX Device Manager (PDM) for PIX OS version 6.x, which runs over https and requires Java
- Adaptive Security Device Manager (ASDM) for PIX OS version 7 and greater, which can run locally on a client or in reduced-functionality mode over HTTPS.

Because Cisco acquired the PIX from Network Translation, the CLI originally did not align with the Cisco IOS syntax. Starting with version 7.0, the configuration became much more IOS-like.

=== Hardware ===
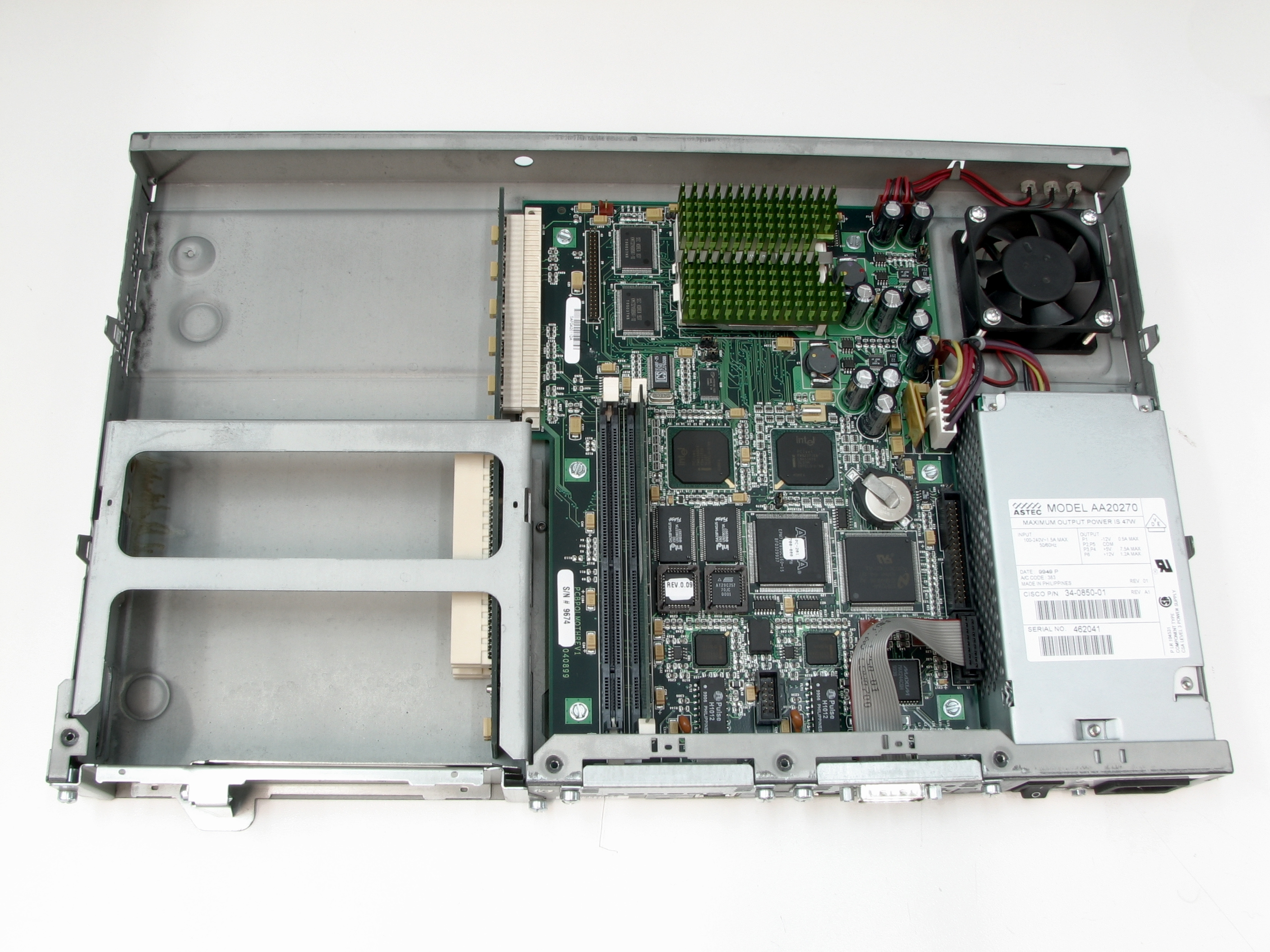
PIX 515 with top cover removed

The original NTI PIX and the PIX Classic had cases that were sourced from OEM provider Appro. All flash cards and the early encryption acceleration cards, the PIX-PL and PIX-PL2, were sourced from Productivity Enhancement Products (PEP). Later models had cases from Cisco OEM manufacturers.

The PIX was constructed using Intel-based/Intel-compatible motherboards; the PIX 501 used an Am5x86 processor, and all other standalone models used Intel 80486 through Pentium III processors.

The PIX boots off a proprietary ISA flash memory daughtercard in the case of the NTI PIX, PIX Classic, 10000, 510, 520, and 535, and it boots off integrated flash memory in the case of the PIX 501, 506/506e, 515/515e, 525, and WS-SVC-FWM-1-K9. The latter is the part code for the PIX technology implemented in the Fire Wall Services Module, for the Catalyst 6500 and the 7600 Router.

== Adaptive Security Appliance (ASA) ==
The Adaptive Security Appliance is a network firewall made by Cisco. It was introduced in 2005 to replace the Cisco PIX line. Along with stateful firewall functionality another focus of the ASA is Virtual Private Network (VPN) functionality. It also features intrusion prevention and Voice over IP. The ASA 5500 series was followed up by the 5500-X series. The 5500-X series focuses more on virtualization than it does on hardware acceleration security modules.

=== History ===
In 2005 Cisco released the 5510, 5520, and 5540 models.

=== Software ===
The ASA continues using the PIX codebase but, when the ASA OS software transitioned from major version 7.X to 8.X, it moved from the Finesse/Pix OS operating system platform to the Linux operating system platform. It also integrates features of the Cisco IPS 4200 intrusion prevention system, and the Cisco VPN 3000 Concentrator.

=== Hardware ===
The ASA continues the PIX lineage of Intel 80x86 hardware.

== Security vulnerabilities ==
The Cisco PIX VPN product was hacked by the NSA-tied group Equation Group sometime before 2016. Equation Group developed a tool code-named BENIGNCERTAIN that reveals the pre-shared password(s) to the attacker (CVE-2016-6415). Equation Group was later hacked by another group called The Shadow Brokers, which published their exploit publicly, among others. According to Ars Technica, the NSA likely used this vulnerability to wiretap VPN-connections for more than a decade, citing the Snowden leaks.

The Cisco ASA-brand was also hacked by Equation Group. The vulnerability requires that both SSH and SNMP are accessible to the attacker. The codename given to this exploit by NSA was EXTRABACON. The bug and exploit (CVE-2016-6366) was also leaked by The ShadowBrokers, in the same batch of exploits and backdoors. According to Ars Technica, the exploit can easily be made to work against more modern versions of Cisco ASA than what the leaked exploit can handle.

On the 29th of January 2018 a security problem at the Cisco ASA-brand was disclosed by Cedric Halbronn from the NCC Group. A use after free-bug in the Secure Sockets Layer (SSL) VPN functionality of the Cisco Adaptive Security Appliance (ASA) Software could allow an unauthenticated remote attacker to cause a reload of the affected system or to remotely execute code. The bug is listed as CVE-2018-0101.

== See also ==
- Cisco LocalDirector
