= Ribbon cable =

Wide and flat cable with multiple conductors

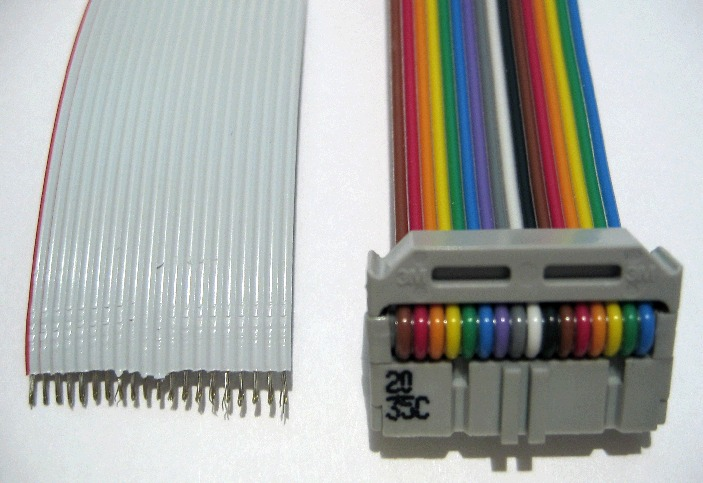
Left: 20-way grey ribbon cable with wire for pin 1 marked red, insulation partly stripped. Right: 16-way rainbow ribbon with IDC connector.

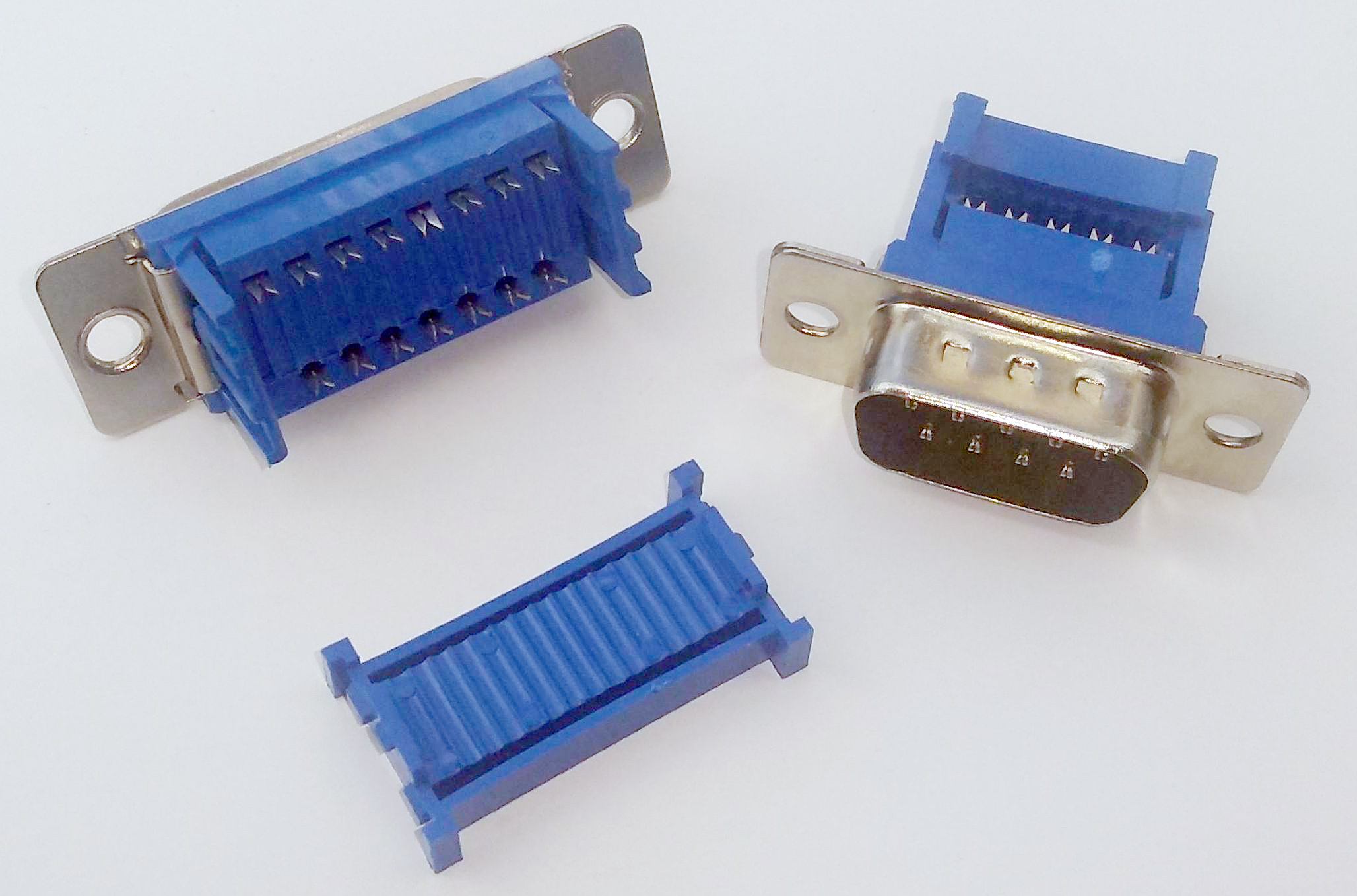
IDC D-sub connectors DE-9 (male) and DA-15 (female)

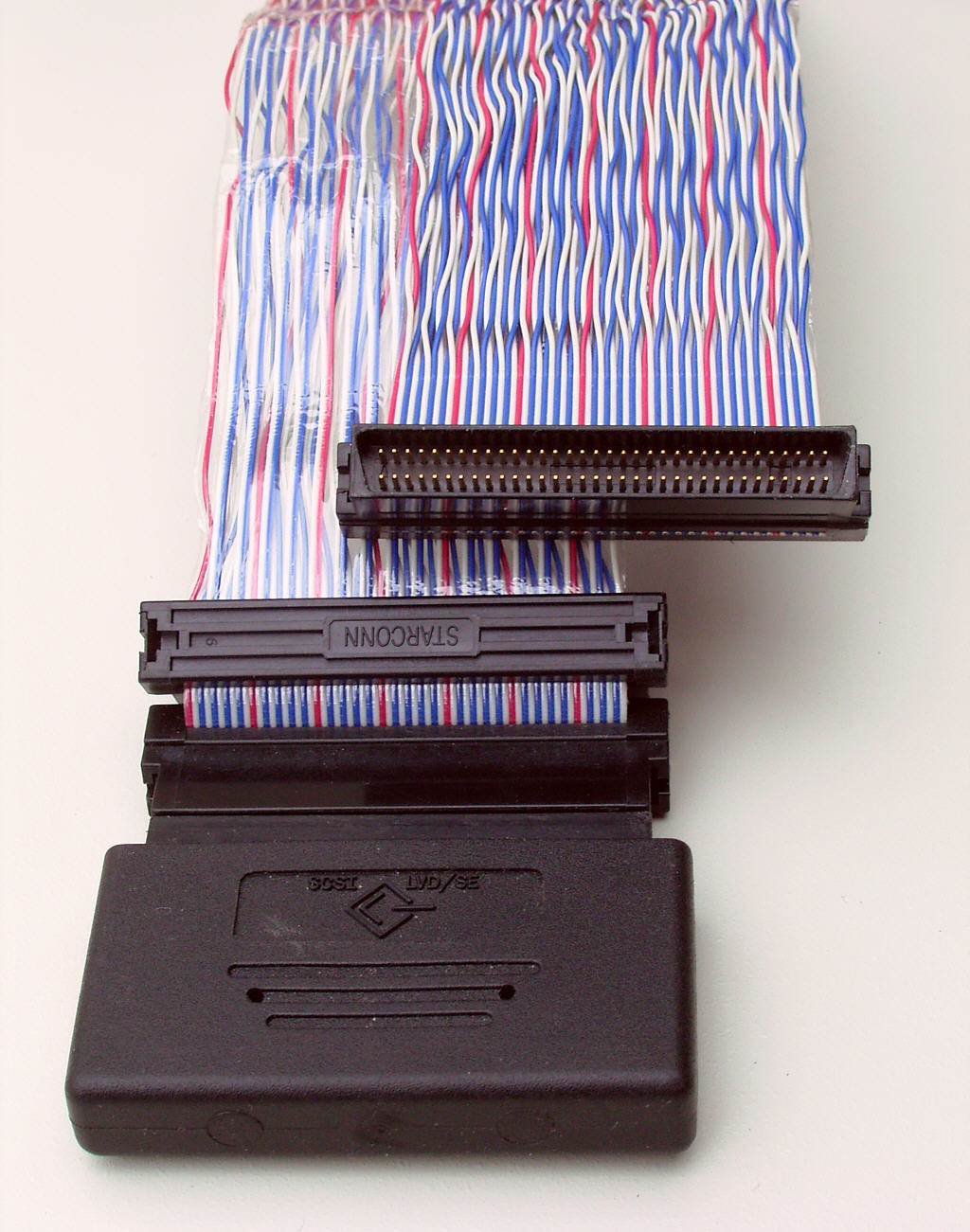
Twisted ribbon cable used for Parallel SCSI connections

A ribbon cable is a cable with many conducting wires running parallel to each other on the same flat plane. As a result, the cable is wide and flat. Its name comes from its resemblance to a piece of ribbon.

Ribbon cables are usually seen for internal peripherals in computers, such as hard drives, CD drives and floppy drives. On some older computer systems (such as the BBC Micro and Apple II) they were used for external connections as well. The ribbon-like shape interferes with computer cooling by disrupting airflow within the case and also makes the cables awkward to handle, especially when there are a lot of them; as a result, round cables have almost entirely replaced ribbon cables for external connections and are increasingly being used internally as well.

== History ==
The original form of ribbon cable was two-conductor 300 ohm twin lead cable used for radio and television, which is also called "ribbon cable". However the more modern forms more commonly called "ribbon cable" typically have many more than just two conductors.

Many-wire ribbon cable was invented in 1956 by Cicoil Corporation, a company based in Chatsworth, California. The company's engineers figured out how to use a new material, silicone rubber, to 'mold' a flat cable containing multiple conductors of the same size. Since the cable looked like a flat ribbon or duct tape, it was named a ribbon cable. The ribbon cable allowed companies like IBM and Sperry / Univac to replace bulky, stiff round cables with sleek, flexible ribbon cables.

The early ribbon cables were used in the mainframe computer industry, on card readers, card punching machines, and tape machines. Subsequently, ribbon cables were manufactured by a number of different companies, including 3M. Methods and materials were developed to simplify and reduce the cost of ribbon cables, by standardizing the design and spacing of the wires, and the thickness of the insulation, so that they could be easily terminated through the use of insulation-displacement connectors (IDC). The simplicity of the cables, their low profile (compared to contemporary alternatives), and low cost due to standardization, meant ribbon cables were long used in computers, printers, and many electronic devices.

== Color-coding ==
To reduce the risk of reversed connections one edge of the cable is usually marked with a red stripe. By convention the edge with the stripe is connected to pin 1 on the connector. This method of identification is fine for cables that just consist of two or more IDC connectors with every connector connecting to every wire, but is somewhat less helpful when individual wires or small groups of wires must be terminated separately.

To make it easier to identify individual conductors in a cable; ribbon-cable manufacturers introduced rainbow ribbon cable, which uses a repeating pattern of colors borrowed from the standard resistor color code (Brown is pin 1 or pin 11 or pin 21, etc. Red is pin 2 or pin 12 or pin 22, etc.). It is sometimes known affectionately to its users as hippie cable due to its distinct appearance.

== Sizes ==
Ribbon cable with three connectors

Ribbon cables are usually specified by two numbers: the spacing or pitch of the conductors, and the number of conductors or ways. A spacing of 0.05 inch (1.27 mm) is the most usual, allowing for a two-row connector with a pin spacing of 0.1 inch (2.54 mm). These types are used for many types of equipment, in particular for interconnections within an enclosure. For personal computers, this size was used in floppy-disk-drive cables and older or custom Parallel ATA cables.

Based on availability of standard connectors, the number of conductors is usually restricted to a few values, These include 4, 6, 8, 9, 10, 14, 15, 16, 18, 20, 24, 25, 26, 34, 37, 40, 50, 60, 64 and 80. Sometimes a larger width is used & stripped back to what is needed e.g. a 26way IDC cable can have one wire easily removed to give a 25way (before adding the connectors). The wire is usually stranded copper wire, usually either 0.32, 0.20, or 0.13 mm^{2} (22, 24, or 26 AWG).

Finer and coarser pitch cables are also available. For instance, the high-speed ATA interface cable used for computer hard disk interfaces ULTRA-ATA has 0.025-inch (0.64-mm) pitch. Finer pitches, as small as 0.3 mm, are found in portable electronic equipment, such as laptops; however, portable electronic equipment usually uses flexible flat cables (FFC).

== Connectors ==
The main point of ribbon cables is to allow mass termination to specially designed IDC connectors in which the ribbon cable is forced onto a row of sharp forked contacts. (The phrase IDC connector is widely used, even though it is redundant—an example of RAS syndrome.) Most commonly termination is done at both ends of the cable, although sometimes (for example, when making a lead that needs to change wiring between the two connectors) only one end will be IDC terminated, with the other end being terminated in a regular crimp or solder-bucket connection. Although it is sometimes possible to dismantle and re-use IDC connectors, they are not designed to allow this to be done easily.

Popular types of connectors available with IDC termination suitable for ribbon cable include

- BT224 connector – also defined by BS9525-F0023, DIN41651, MIL-C-83503 standards; these are the type used on ATA cables and are often simply called IDC connectors. They mate with either a purpose-made plug or a two-row grid of header pins with 0.1 inch (2.54 mm) spacing.
- D-subminiature connector – used for serial ports and printer ports (however IDC D connectors are far less common than crimp and solder bucket types).
- Micro ribbon connector - used for 36-pin printer ports (IEEE 1284 - Centronics) and 50-pin SCSI ports.
- DIN 41612 connector – used for Eurocard buses.
- PCB transition headers – has two rows of pins with the same spacings as BT244 connectors. Intended to be soldered directly into a PCB.
- DIL headers – Has pins with the same spacings as standard DIL ICs. Generally used where for some reason it is desired to replace an IC with a connection to an external device (e.g., in-circuit emulators). Can also be used like a PCB transition header, especially on stripboard. (Fitting a standard-spacing header to stripboard is tricky, because you have to cut the tracks between two holes rather than on a hole.)

When electronics hobbyists are working on their computers or digital musical keyboards to mod (modify) or hack them, they sometimes have to solder ribbon cables. Soldering ribbon cables can present a challenge to a hobbyist who has not been trained as an electronics technician. In some cases, hobbyists strip off the wire with a fine razor, and then separate the wires before soldering them. Some hobbyists use fine sandpaper to wear away the plastic insulation from the wires. The sanding also primes the copper tracks. Then when the tinned soldering iron is touched onto the bare wire, the solder is guided into the track.

=== Interference ===
From a digital point of view, ribbon cable was an ideal way to connect two devices. However, from an analog point of view, these cables are problematic. Around 1980, the U.S. Federal Communications Commission (FCC) discovered that ribbon cables were highly efficient antennas, broadcasting essentially random signals, or Electromagnetic interference, across a wide band of the electromagnetic spectrum. These unintended signals could interfere with domestic TV reception, putting snow on the screen. The FCC issued edicts and injunctions to the personal-computer industry, restricting the use of ribbon cables to connect devices together. Naked ribbon cable could be used inside the case of a computer or peripheral device, but any ribbon cable connecting two boxes together had to be grounded. This rule led to solutions such as ribbon cables covered by a copper-braid shield, which made it impossible to see or separate the individual connectors. On the Apple II, these cables passed through the holes on the back of the computer that were grounded to the power supply. Eventually, ribbon connectors were replaced, for interconnect purposes, by a wide profusion of custom-designed round cables with molded connectors.

=== Characteristic impedance ===
For a ribbon cable using 26AWG wire, 0.050" spacing and common PVC insulation the resultant characteristic impedance for any two adjacent wires within the cable is 110 to 130 ohms. The precise number will vary a few percent due to materials. Knowledge of the characteristic impedance is one step toward understanding and control of interference that may be caused by ribbon cables.

== See also ==
- Flexible flat cable (FFC)
