= Electronics prototyping =

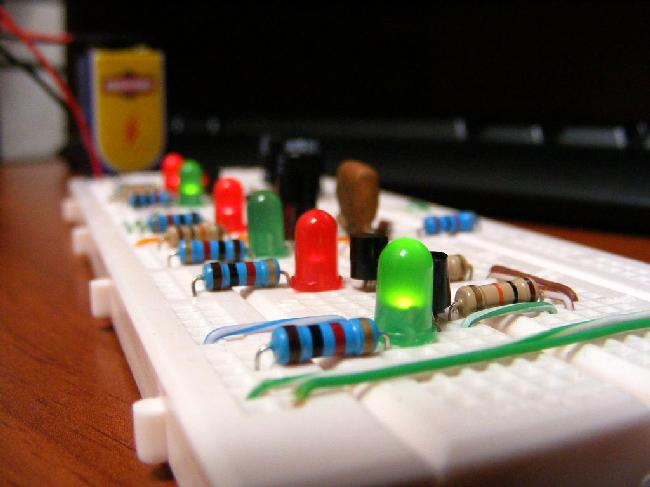
A simple electronic circuit prototype on a breadboard

In electronics, prototyping means building an actual circuit to a theoretical design to verify that it works, and to provide a physical platform for debugging it if it does not. The prototype is often constructed using techniques such as wire wrapping or using a breadboard, stripboard or perfboard, with the result being a circuit that is electrically identical to the design but not physically identical to the final product.

Open-source tools like Fritzing exist to document electronic prototypes (especially the breadboard-based ones) and move toward physical production. Prototyping platforms such as Arduino also simplify the task of programming and interacting with a microcontroller. The developer can choose to deploy their invention as-is using the prototyping platform, or replace it with only the microcontroller chip and the circuitry that is relevant to their product.

A technician can quickly build a prototype (and make additions and modifications) using these techniques, but for volume production it is much faster and usually cheaper to mass-produce custom printed circuit boards than to produce these other kinds of prototype boards. The proliferation of quick-turn PCB fabrication and assembly companies has enabled the concepts of rapid prototyping to be applied to electronic circuit design. It is now possible, even with the smallest passive components and largest fine-pitch packages, to have boards fabricated, assembled, and even tested in a matter of days.

== Boards ==
=== Breadboard ===
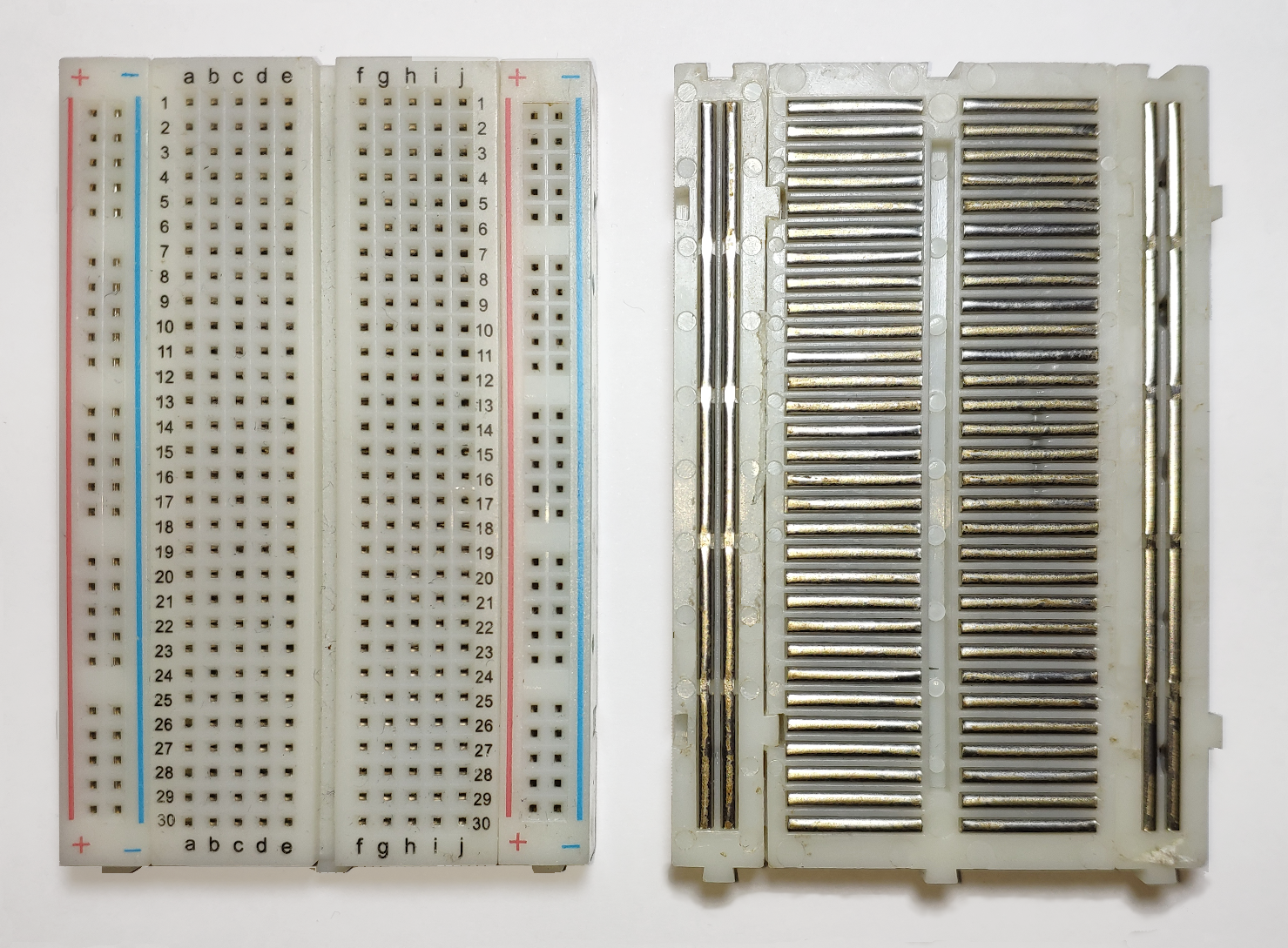
400 point solderless breadboard with 0.1 inches (2.54 mm) hole-to-hole spacing, top and bottom views

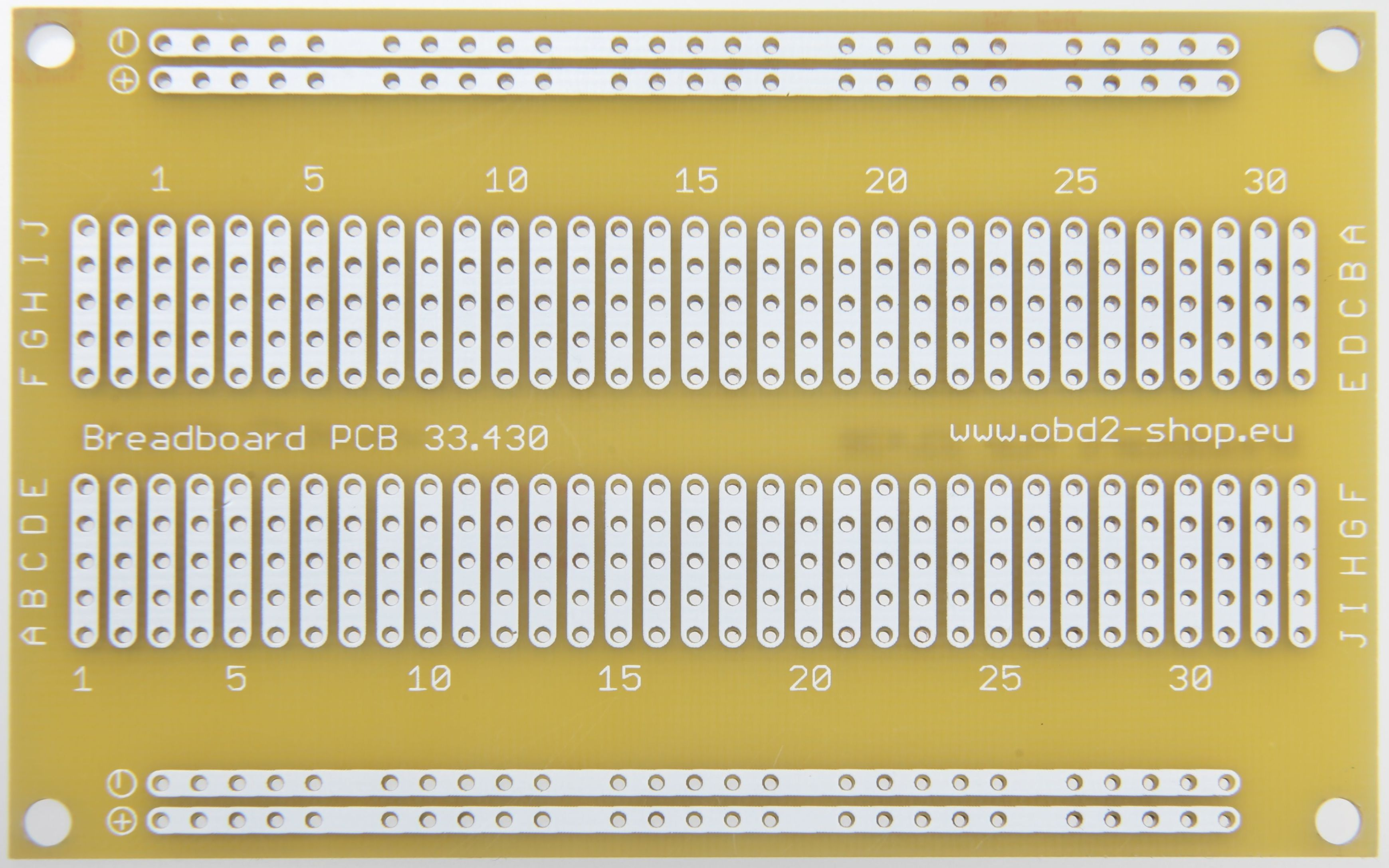
400 point printed circuit board (PCB) is electrically equivalent to the above solderless breadboard

A breadboard, solderless breadboard, or protoboard is a construction base used to build semi-permanent prototypes of electronic circuits. Unlike a perfboard or stripboard, breadboards do not require soldering or destruction of tracks and are hence reusable. For this reason, breadboards are also popular with students and in technological education.

A variety of electronic systems may be prototyped by using breadboards, from small analog and digital circuits to complete central processing units (CPUs).

Compared to more permanent circuit connection methods, modern breadboards have high parasitic capacitance, relatively high resistance, and less reliable connections, which are subject to jostle and physical degradation. Signaling is limited to about 10 MHz, and even well below that frequency not everything works properly.

=== Perfboard ===
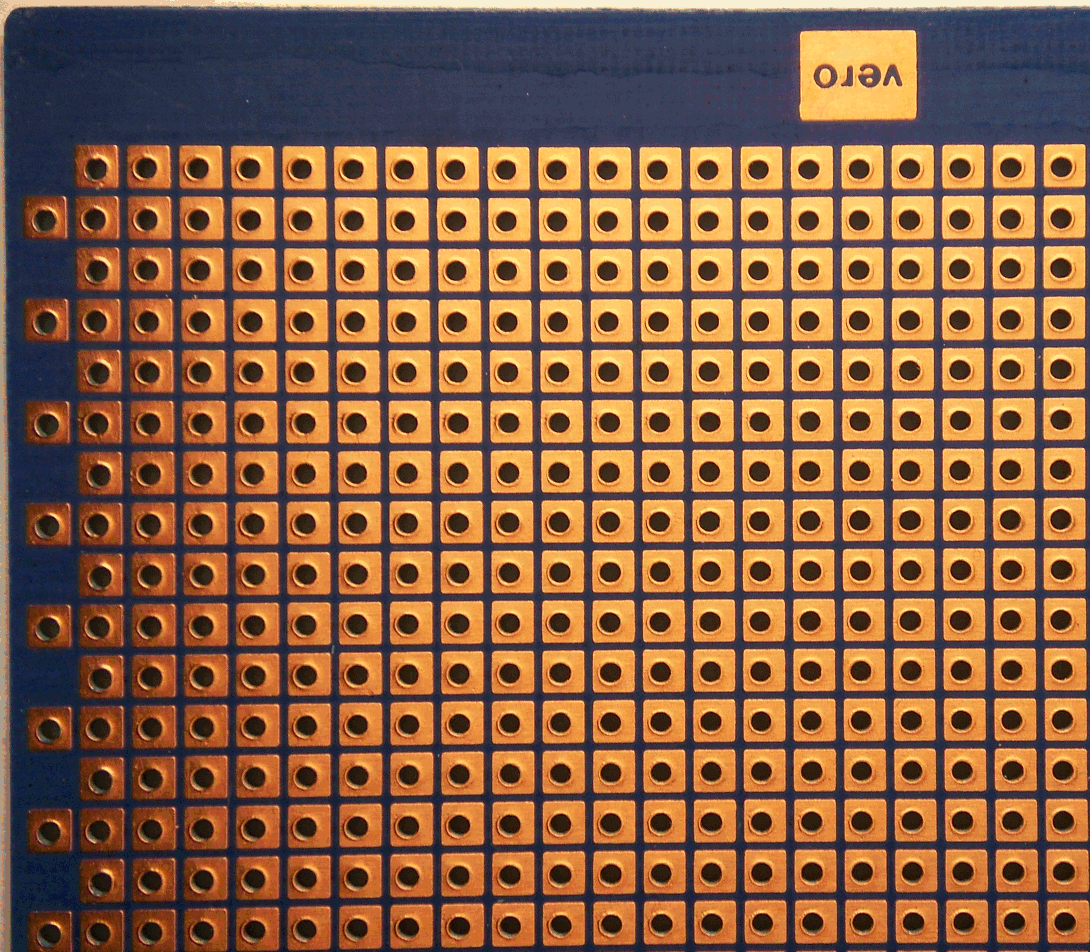
Top of a copper clad Perfboard with solder pads for each hole.

Perfboard is a material for prototyping electronic circuits. It is a thin, rigid sheet with holes pre-drilled at standard intervals across a grid, usually a square grid of 0.1 inches (2.54 mm) spacing. These holes are ringed by round or square copper pads, though bare boards are also available. Inexpensive perfboard may have pads on only one side of the board, while better quality perfboard can have pads on both sides (plate-through holes). Since each pad is electrically isolated, the builder makes all connections with either wire wrap or miniature point to point wiring techniques. Discrete components are soldered to the prototype board such as resistors, capacitors, and integrated circuits. The substrate is typically made of paper laminated with phenolic resin (such as FR-2) or a fiberglass-reinforced epoxy laminate (FR-4).

=== Stripboard ===
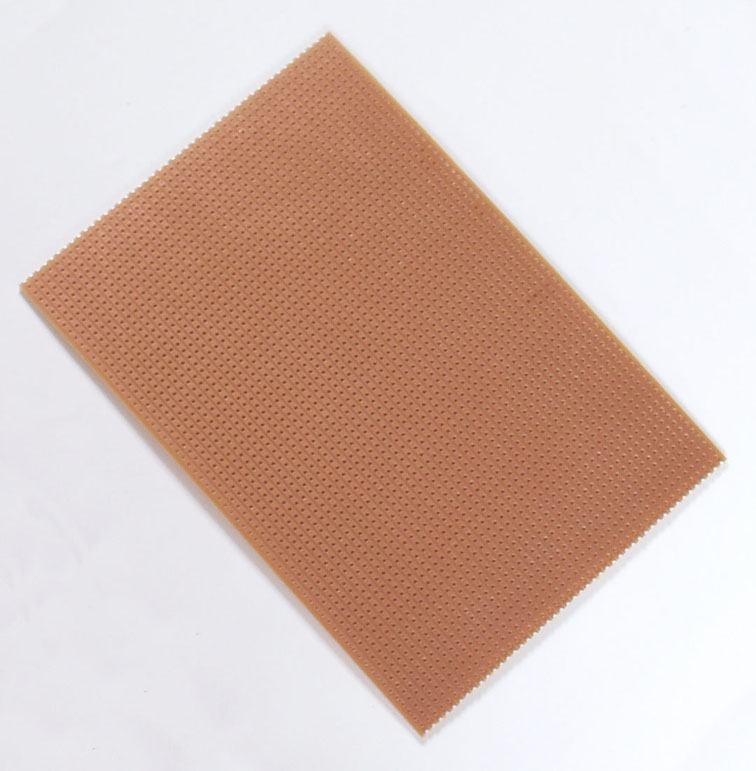
A piece of unused stripboard

Stripboard is the generic name for a widely used type of electronics prototyping material for circuit boards characterized by a pre-formed 0.1 inches (2.54 mm) regular (rectangular) grid of holes, with wide parallel strips of copper cladding running in one direction all the way along one side of an insulating bonded paper board. It is commonly also known by the name of the original product Veroboard, which is a trademark, in the UK, of British company Vero Technologies Ltd and Canadian company Pixel Print Ltd. It was originated and developed in the early 1960s by the Electronics Department of Vero Precision Engineering Ltd (VPE). It was introduced as a general-purpose material for use in constructing electronic circuits - differing from purpose-designed printed circuit boards (PCBs) in that a variety of electronics circuits may be constructed using a standard wiring board.

In using the board, breaks are made in the tracks, usually around holes, to divide the strips into multiple electrical nodes. With care, it is possible to break between holes to allow for components that have two pin rows only one position apart such as twin row headers for IDCs.

Stripboard is not designed for surface-mount components, though it is possible to mount many such components on the track side, particularly if tracks are cut/shaped with a knife or small cutting disc in a rotary tool.

The first single-size Veroboard product was the forerunner of the numerous types of prototype wiring board which, with worldwide use over five decades, have become known as stripboard.

The generic terms 'veroboard' and 'stripboard' are now taken to be synonymous.
