= Breadboard (disambiguation) =

A breadboard is a construction base used in electric/electronic circuit prototyping.

Breadboard may also refer to:

- Breadboard or cutting board, a food preparation utensil (of which the first electronic breadboards were made)
  - A pull-out cutting board underneath a counter (furniture)
- Optical breadboard, used in optics labs
- Mechanical breadboard, sometimes used in developing mechanical systems
- Brassboard, a stage in engineering prototype development
- Smorgasbord, a buffet-style meal (literally "(buttered) bread table/board")
