= Fritzing =

Open source CAD system for electronic design, aimed at hobbyists

Fritzing Software

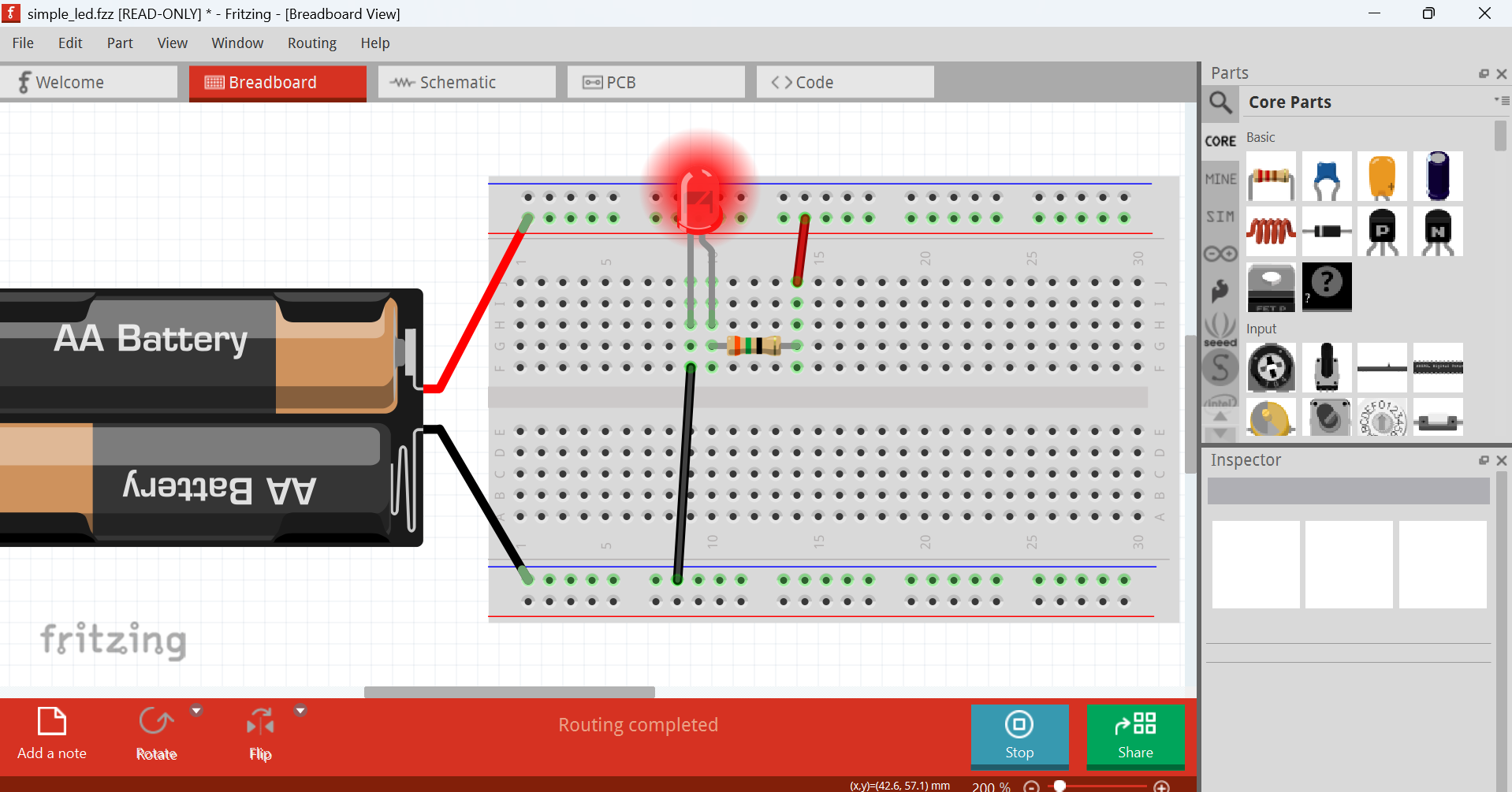
- Fritzing's breadboard view
- Developer: Interaction Design Lab Potsdam
- Stable release: 1.0.8 / 12 August 2026; 3 months ago
- Written in: C++
- Operating system: Microsoft Windows, Windows 8 and later, Windows 11 ARM; macOS, macOS Big Sur and later; Linux
- Available in: 18 languages
- List of languages: Bulgarian; Chinese (Simplified, Traditional); Czech; Dutch; English; French; German; Greek; Italian; Japanese; Korean; Portuguese (Brazilian, European); Russian; Slovak; Spanish; Turkish; Ukrainian
- Type: EDA
- License: GPL 3.0 or later (software); CC BY-SA 3.0 (component images)
- Website: fritzing.org; github.com/fritzing/fritzing-app
- Repository: github.com/fritzing/fritzing-app

Fritzing is an open-source initiative to develop amateur or hobby CAD software for the design of electronics hardware, intended to allow designers and artists to build more permanent circuits from prototypes. It was developed at the University of Applied Sciences Potsdam. Fritzing is free software under the GPL 3.0 or later license, with the source code available on GitHub and the binaries at a monetary cost, which is allowed by the GPL.

== Goals ==
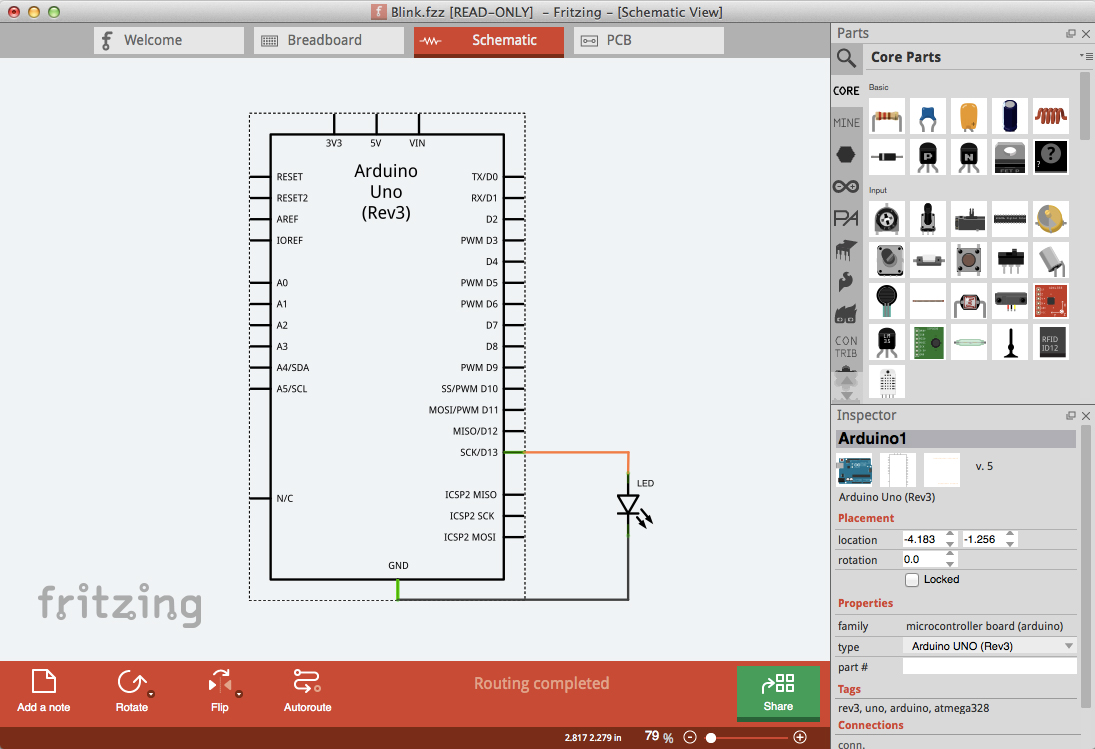
Fritzing's schematic view

The software was created with inspiration from the Processing programming language and the Arduino microcontroller and allows a designer, artist, researcher, or hobbyist to document their Arduino-based prototype and create a PCB layout for manufacturing. The associated website helps users share and discuss drafts and experiences as well as to reduce manufacturing costs.

Fritzing can be seen as an electronic design automation (EDA) tool for non-engineers: the input metaphor is inspired by the environment of designers (the breadboard-based prototype), while the output is focused on accessible means of production. As of December 2, 2014 Fritzing has made a code view option, where one can modify code and upload it directly to an Arduino device.

Component images are distributed under CC BY-SA 3.0, which will also be the license for any generated breadboard views.

Breadboard view of a simple circuit, drawn with Fritzing.

Circuit diagram of the same circuit.

== Other services ==
=== Fritzing Creator Kit ===
The "Fritzing Creator Kit" is available for purchase in the website's online shop. It is a set of various electronic components, including an Arduino UNO board depending on the model, and a book explaining various experiments that can be conducted using the kit. The Fritzing Creator Kit is currently available in English and German. The set is aimed primarily at young people aged 12 and older, who are encouraged to immerse themselves in the world of electronics with the help of the Fritzing Creator Kit.

=== Fritzing Fab ===
Fritzing allows for creation of PCBs. Fritzing provides access to a commercial service known as 'FritzingFab' to order PCBs created with designs made on the Fritzing software.

== 2016-2019 Fritzing Development Stall ==
From 2016-2019, development for version 0.9.4 stopped, mainly because Fritzing's revenue declined. Before 2016, when Fritzing 0.9.3b was released, donations were not mandatory, so only a few users who downloaded Fritzing donated. Some users wanted development to continue.

Finally, in 2019, Aisler arranged a development team for Fritzing, started an initiative to find a Maintainer for Fritzing, to which Kjell Morgenstern responded, and version 0.9.4 was released. Since then, donations were compulsory, with options to donate either 8€ or 25€.

== Simulator ==
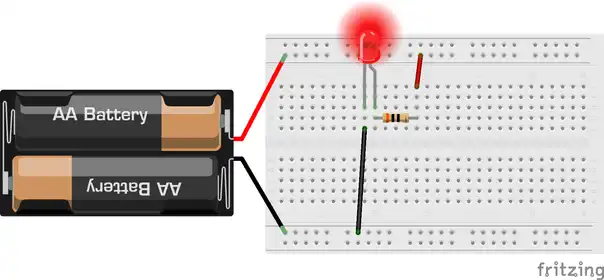
Breadboard view of an LED (Simulated with Fritzing's Simulator on v0.9.10)

555 IC Astable Circuit (Simulated with the Transitory Simulator on v1.0.5)

Since version 0.9.10, Fritzing incorporates a basic simulator, which became non-beta in version 1.0.0. The main aim of the simulator is to teach electronics to beginners, and Fritzing version 0.9.10 only supports analysis of DC circuits. The simulator works on the breadboard and schematic views. In addition, it checks that the parts are working within their specifications (otherwise, a smoke symbol appears). The simulator provides multimeters to read voltages and currents and it attempts to recreate a realistic laboratory session.

The simulator was officially supported in Fritzing 1.0.0, and improvements have been made since.

Transient mode for simulation (or Transitory Simulation) was also released, but it is still a beta feature and is only enabled for Fritzing in debug mode.

== Friends of Fritzing e.V. ==
Friends of Fritzing e.V. Batch

Friends of Fritzing e.V. was a non-profit association established in 2012 to support the development and sustainability of the Fritzing project. Fritzing itself began in 2007 as a publicly funded research initiative at the University of Applied Sciences Potsdam, Germany, and later transitioned to community-driven development.

The foundation played a crucial role in maintaining the Fritzing software and its ecosystem. However, due to administrative overhead, Friends of Fritzing e.V. ceased operations in 2018.

Following the closure, the Fritzing team sought alternative methods to sustain the project. Kjell Morgenstern proposed having initiatives like the support for payments by FlatHub, or even a Snap Store with micropayments. In the end, the team transitioned to Open Collective

== Release history ==
Version	Release date	Notable features, changes
0.6.x
0.6.0b	9 July 2011	Support for SMD parts, 70 SparkFun Parts, stripboards and perfboards; cleaned up parts Inspector, text/graphics on copper layers, bug fixes
0.6.1b	10 July 2011	Fixed Windows plugin files
0.6.2b	11 July 2011	Fixed incorrect ratnest lines and copper fill blobs; new half-breadboard part
0.6.3b	18 August 2011	Bendable legs for many parts in breadboard view, Bézier curves for wires and bendable legs in breadboard view, more intelligent connection handling when swapping dissimilar parts, easier to select small traces in PCB view, more extensive cursor feedback, wider range of LED colors, new parts, moved some options from the View menu to Preferences, bug fixes around Gerber export
0.7.x
0.7.0	2 July 2012	More accurate export for PCB manufacturing, better Gerber file generation, improved copper fill, refinements in board shape generation
0.7.1	Early 2012	Minor improvements and bug fixes
0.7.2	Early 2012	Minor improvements and bug fixes
0.7.3	10 April 2012	Minor improvements and bug fixes (Note: release information not found)
0.7.4 (Note: publicly distributed via Linux distros (e.g. Ubuntu), not formally announced by the Fritzing team.)	April–May 2012	Minor improvements and bug fixes
0.7.5	2 July 2012	Added ability to add multiple PCBs in one sketch, new arduino shield layout, new generic double row headers
0.7.5b (Note: Note: A bugfix update to 0.7.5, despite having the "b" which usually implies "beta". In this case, it represents a post-release patch rather than a pre-release.)	3 July 2012	Added ability to add multiple PCBs in one sketch, new arduino shield layout, new generic double row headers
0.8.x
0.8.5b	17 December 2013	Styling changes, ICSP and no ICSP Arduino parts, bug fixes
0.8.6	23 January 2014	Changed grid size from 0.7mm to 0.1in, bug fixes
0.8.7b	24 January 2014	Fixed battery parts with inverted schematics
0.9.x
0.9.1b	2 December 2014	New code view, new parts, bug fixes, updated translations
0.9.2b	3 April 2015	New parts, added Romanian translation
0.9.3b	2 June 2016	Continuously updated parts library, critical PCB‑trace bug fix, high‑DPI support, improved part tools, load/save .fz, icons, new parts
0.9.4	1 December 2019	Critical autorouter fix, color‑coded wires, TLS, fixed parts‑search bug, updated translations
0.9.5d	Development version; skipped	
0.9.6	22 February 2021	Windows/Mac signed builds, bug fixes
0.9.7	21 July 2021	Linux AppImage, .fzp support, 249 issues closed
0.9.8	9 August 2021	Fixed broken Generic IC
0.9.9	24 September 2021	Fab upload memory, keyboard shortcuts, search & part fixes
0.9.10	22 May 2022	Japanese translation, simulator, hi‑res export, new parts
1.0.x
1.0.0	19 June 2023	Official simulator, OCR‑Fritzing font, IPC‑D‑356 export, UI improvements
1.0.1	6 September 2023	Minor improvements and bug fixes
1.0.2	2 January 2024	Schematic subparts, swap improvements, bug fixes
1.0.3	26 June 2024	Minor improvements and bug fixes
1.0.4	10 October 2024	QFN support, PCB UX improvements, alpha‑channel board images
1.0.5	14 April 2025	Arduino CLI v2+, NotoSans font, hardware acceleration, ARM64 installer, bug fixes
1.0.6	21 October 2025	New Adafruit Bin, Generic IC improvements, Fixed copper/ground fill, Fixed incorrect version display, hide obsolete parts in the search
1.0.7	Q4 2025	Unknown
1.1.x
1.1.0	TBA	Migrate framework from Qt 6.5 to Qt 6.7
Legend (Note: Note: Not to be comfused with the Wikipedia's Version Template)
Pre-Beta version Beta version Supported version Latest version Upcoming/Development version Unknown/Unconfirmed To Be Announced (TBA)

== See also ==
- Comparison of EDA software
- List of free and open-source EDA software
- List of free and open source software packages
- List of free electronics circuit simulators
- Tinkercad Circuits
