= Vero Precision Engineering =

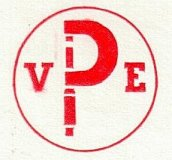

Vero Precision Engineering Ltd
- Foundation: 1955
- Location: 7 South Mill Rd, Southampton, UK
- Industry: Precision engineering
- Products: Machine tools
- Key people: Geoffrey Verdon-Roe; Lawrence Leech
- Defunct: Dissolution in 1996

Vero Electronics Ltd
- Foundation: 1961
- Location: Chandler's Ford, UK
- Industry: Electronics
- Products: Electronic components
- Defunct: Liquidation in 2009
- Successors: Vero Technologies Ltd, Verotec Ltd

Vero Precision Engineering Ltd (VPE) was a UK machine-tool manufacturing company which operated from premises at 7 South Mill Rd, Southampton SO15 4JW.

The 1933 O.S. Map shows this location as Crown Works occupied by an electrical engineering company which by 1934 had been replaced by Weir Precision Engineering Ltd.

Weir Precision continued their engineering operations at South Mill Rd, until 1955 at which time they were taken over by High Precision Engineering Ltd - a company recently formed by Geoffrey Verdon-Roe and associates.

The chairman of the new company was Sir Alliott Verdon-Roe (until his death in 1958) and managing director was his son Geoffrey Verdon-Roe. Among the names of other directors found on the VPE Letterhead were Lawrence Leech and also son Royce Verdon-Roe.

To avoid confusion with another firm the company name was changed to Vero Precision Engineering Ltd. soon after incorporation - the new name following the tradition of acronyms set by Sir Alliott at A.V. Roe and Company (Avro) and Saunders-Roe Ltd (Saro).

== Engineering ==
From the 1955 startup VPE progressed as a top-class machine-tool design and manufacturing company with a staff of highly qualified engineers - some being of Swiss and German origin.

A small sample of the wide production range of the company includes hydraulic copy milling attachments, automatic drilling machines and camshaft milling machines - as supplied respectively to:

- the de Havilland Engine Company.
- the Aviation Division of S. Smith and Sons (England) Ltd - later part of the present Smiths Group plc.
- Weyburn Engineering Co Ltd, Elstead, Surrey (later acquired by Federal-Mogul Corporation).

The standing of Vero Precision in the industry is demonstrated by the writing of E. T. Foulds founder of The Middlesex Group when, as a competitor in the machine-tool market, he comments that VPE had one of 'the best equipped toolrooms' in the UK.

Shortly after taking over from Weir PE Ltd, VPE had commenced installation of numerical control (NC) for some of their machine tools and then, later in the 1950s, the need for the introduction of electronic control equipment was recognised.

A VPE subsidiary company, Vero N.C. Developments Ltd, also trading from South Mill Rd, was incorporated in 1968 with the name changing to Vero Advanced Products Limited in 1979. This company was concerned with the supply and installation of the machine-tool output of VPE until it closed in 1999.

Under new directors in 1994, the parent company name, Vero Precision Engineering Ltd, was changed to VPE Ltd to continue with the machine-tool operations.

In 1996, VPE Ltd was brought to an end by final dissolution.

== Electronics ==
In 1959, VPE managing director Geoffrey Verdon-Roe hired two former Saunders-Roe Ltd employees, Peter H Winter (aircraft design department) and Terry Fitzpatrick (electronics division) to form an Electronics Department commissioned to investigate electronic control for the VPE machine tools.

A control system based on a Moire pattern sensor feeding a semiconductor decade counter was produced but the project failed to achieve the required machining accuracy - resulting in the termination of all electronics design activity in 1960.

However the Electronics Department continued to function in the short term as a result of success with the invention and development of Veroboard - a new type of universal printed circuit board which would be manufactured by the VPE machine tool department. After initial production problems were overcome output rates improved and attention moved from product development to commercial activities resulting in the VPE Electronics Department being closed down.

In 1961 Vero Electronics Ltd was set up as a separate company to take over the further development, marketing and sales of Veroboard and a number of associated electronics products. Early success for the new venture was demonstrated by their 1964 catalogues which featured Veroboard in 92 formats - together with many accessories and a rack assembly system.

== Company development ==
Vero Electronics Ltd was incorporated 22 Aug 1961 (as 'Company No 00701364 Limited'). The rapid growth of the company soon necessitated removal from the VPE factory site and by 1967 Vero Electronics Ltd were in larger premises at School Close, Chandler's Ford, Hampshire. In 1975 Vero Electronics Ltd main offices remained in Chandler's Ford and with continued expansion there were new facilities for product production in Spring Rd, Sholing, Southampton, a Finishing Dept. in Botley plus Stores and Despatch at Eastleigh.

VERO Electronics GmbH had been established by 1964 (as a subsidiary of VERO in the UK) to market Veroboard in Germany. Production was parallel with that in the UK at a small facility set up in Bremen. By 1977 VERO Electronics GmbH had also built up a power supplies division and launched 19" switched-mode power supplies for use in their 19" racks. From year 2000 the company was entirely concerned with power supply products and was eventually renamed EPLAX GmbH.

BICC-Vero Electronics Ltd was formed when major English cable-manufacturing group British Insulated Callender's Cables acquired the Vero Group in a 1979 move to enter new technology sectors. The Vero Electronics Ltd offices and factories remained operative in the 1975 locations until 1981 but in 1982 the company name was changed to BICC-Vero Electronics Ltd.

BICC-Vero acquired the Imhof Group of England in 1986 and the "IMRAK" cabinet business was built up. The IMRAK 1400 cabinets had evolved from work on electronics enclosure systems based on the 19-inch rack originally developed by Alfred lmhof Limited, London.

Vero Group Plc originated when the Vero Group was separated from BICC in a management buyout (MBO) with backing from investors and was renamed Vero Electronics Group Ltd - the name changing to Vero Group Plc in 1995.

Applied Power, Inc. (The US company founded in 1910 and to become Actuant Corporation in 2001) acquired the Vero Group for $191.7 million in 1998 after sales of $170 million and earnings of $17 million had been recorded for 1997.

APW Electronics Group Plc was the new name for Vero Group Plc after Applied Power restructuring in 1999. In 2007 the APW Electronics Group went into administration and ceased trading.

- The original company Vero Electronics Ltd (Company No 00701364 Limited) was dissolved 13 Aug 2009 - after 48 years trading.
- The South Mill Rd works site has been replaced by a housing development named Avro Close.

== Successors ==
Vero Technologies Ltd was formed in 2003 when APW sold off the prototyping business (Veroboard). The company is located at Hedge End, Hampshire where they continue operations supplying a range of electronic components including stripboard and Veroboard.

Verotec Ltd was originally formed as Backplane Systems Ltd in 2005 and acquired the intellectual property rights to many of the Vero products (other than Veroboard) from the APW administrators in 2007. In 2013 they had facilities at Chandler's Ford UK, Derry NH USA and Bailleul-sur-Thérain France
