= Vero Technologies Ltd =

- Foundation: 2003
- Location: Hedge End, UK
- Industry: Electronics
- Products: Electronic components

Vero Technologies Ltd is a UK company located at Hedge End, Hampshire, UK and formed in 2003 after the APW Electronics Group went into administration. The APW intellectual property was sold off to various companies around the world with the prototype and plastic enclosures business being acquired by Vero Technologies (trading as verodirect.com).

The company is the latest in the line of successors to Vero Electronics Ltd which was set up in 1961 by Vero Precision Engineering Ltd to produce and market Veroboard. Vero Technologies currently supply a range of electronic components including stripboard and Veroboard.
