= Brassboard =

A brassboard or brass board is an experimental or demonstration test model, intended for field testing outside the laboratory environment. A brassboard follows an earlier prototyping stage called a breadboard. A brassboard contains both the functionality and approximate physical configuration of the final operational product. Unlike breadboards, brassboards typically recreate geometric and dimensional constraints of the final system which are critical to its performance, as is the case in radio frequency systems. While representative of the physical layout of the production-grade product, a brassboard will not necessarily incorporate all final details, nor represent the physical size and quality level of the final deliverable product.

Exact definition of a brassboard depends on the industry and has changed with time. A 1992 guide book on proposal preparation defined a brassboard or a breadboard as "a laboratory or shop working model that may or may not look like the final product or system, but that will operate in the same way as the final system". The definition of a breadboard was further narrowed to purely electronic systems, while a brassboard was treated as "a similar arrangement for hydraulic, pneumatic or mechanically interconnected components".

In modern system-on-a-chip prototyping, brassboard is defined as a second prototyping stage that follows engineering validation boards (EVB) and precedes wingboards and final pre-production samples. In a single example the board area decreases four times with each of these steps, so the brassboard is one fourth as large as an EVB, four times larger than the wingboard and around sixteen times larger than a production device. Most systems in the vast array of industries cannot be characterized so specifically.
