= Test article =

Test article may refer to:

- Test article (aerospace)
- Test article (food and medicine)
- Test article, part of nondestructive testing
