= FR-2 =

Designation for synthetic resin bonded paper

FR-2 (Flame Resistant 2) is a NEMA designation for synthetic resin bonded paper, a composite material made of paper impregnated with a plasticized phenol formaldehyde resin, used in the manufacture of printed circuit boards. Its main properties are similar to NEMA grade XXXP (MIL-P-3115) material, and can be substituted for the latter in many applications.

== Applications ==
FR-2 sheet with copper foil lamination on one or both sides is widely used to build low-end consumer electronics equipment. While its electrical and mechanical properties are inferior to those of epoxy-bonded fiberglass, FR-4, it is significantly cheaper. It is not suitable for devices installed in vehicles, as continuous vibration can make cracks propagate, causing hairline fractures in copper circuit traces. Without copper foil lamination, FR-2 is sometimes used for simple structural shapes and electrical insulation.

== Properties ==
Property	Value
Dielectric constant, or relative permittivity	4.5 @ 1 MHz
Dissipation factor	0.024–0.26 @ 1 MHz
Dielectric strength	29 kV/mm (740 V/thou)

== Fabrication ==
FR-2 can be machined by drilling, sawing, milling and hot punching. Cold punching and shearing are not recommended, as they leave a ragged edge and tend to cause cracking. Tools made of high-speed steel can be used, although tungsten carbide tooling is preferred for high volume production.

Adequate ventilation or respiration protection are mandatory during high-speed machining, as it gives off toxic vapors.

== Trade names and synonyms ==
- Carta
- Haefelyt
- Lamitex
- Paxolin, Paxoline
- Pertinax, taken over by Lamitec and Dr. Dietrich Müller GmbH in 2014
- Getinax (in the Ex-USSR)
- Phenolic paper
- Preßzell
- Repelit
- Synthetic resin bonded paper (SRBP)
- Turbonit
- Veroboard
- Wahnerit

== See also ==
- Formica (plastic)
- Micarta
