= Nera (company) =

Norwegian telecommunications company

Nera Networks AS
- Type: Subsidiary
- Industry: Electronics
- Founded: 1947
- Headquarters: Norway
- Revenue: NOK 2,370 million (2004)
- Net income: NOK –167.1 million (2004)
- Parent: Ceragon

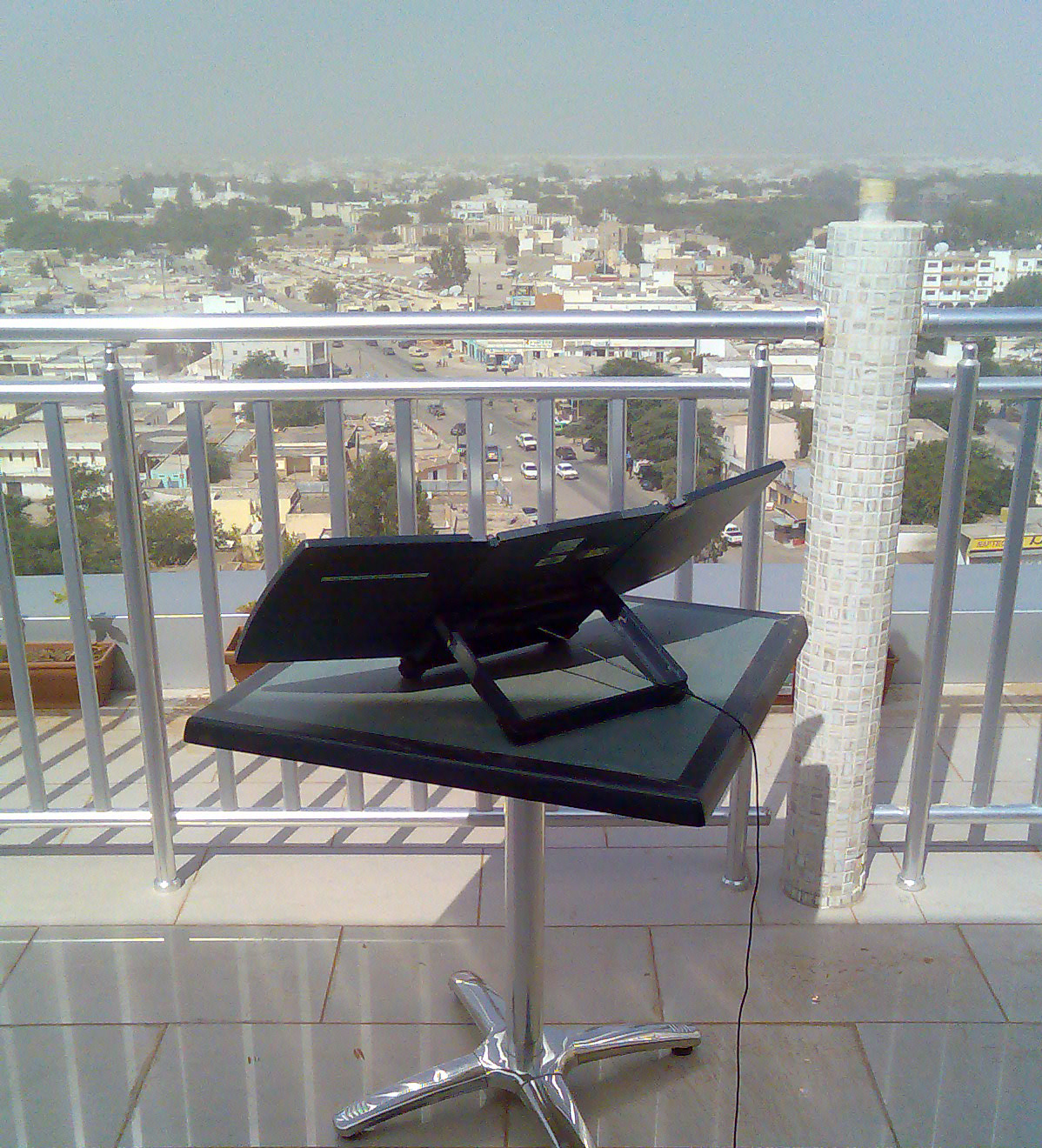
Nera satellite phone antenna pointing across Nouakchott, Mauritania

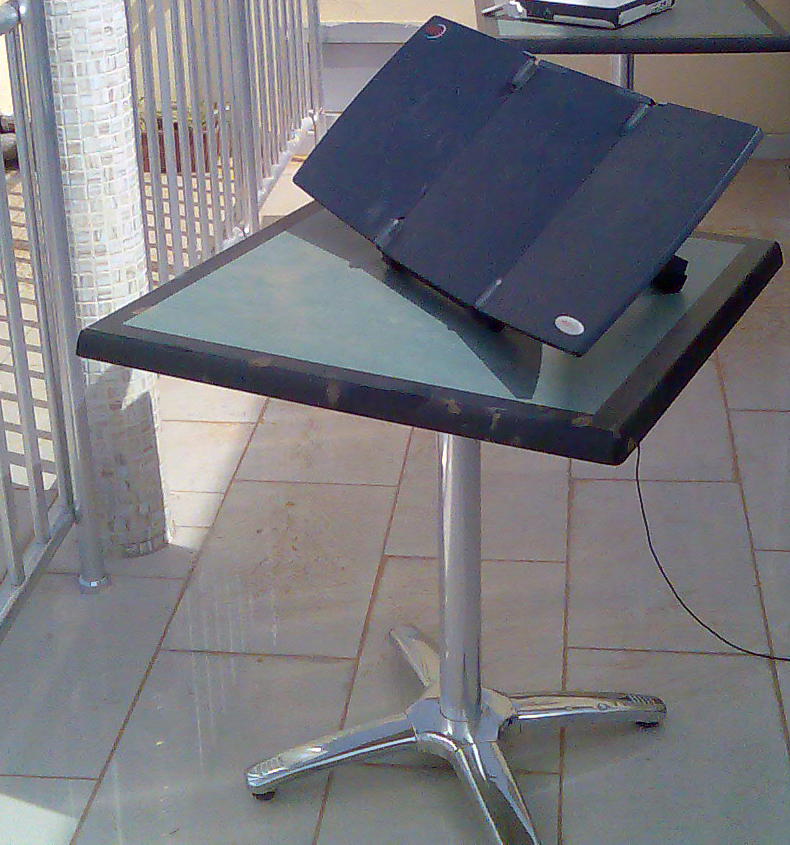
Front of Nera satellite phone antenna pointing across Nouakchott

Nera Networks AS (part of Nera) was a Norwegian company working in the field of Wireless telecommunications using microwave and satellite technology. Nera Networks AS was a subsidiary of Eltek based in Bergen, with offices in 26 countries and more than 1,500 employees. The company was acquired by Ceragon Networks in 2011

Nera was operational through its three subsidiaries:

- Nera Networks AS (transmission systems). Provided radio link equipment and systems, antenna systems and turnkey telecommunications transmission networks. Mainly sold to telecommunication equipment makers and mobile and broadcast network operators. Nera Networks AS was acquired by Ceragon in 2011.
- Nera SatCom AS (satellite communications business). Provided satellite communication equipment for global data and voice at land, sea, and air. In 2007 Nera SatCom was purchased by Thrane and Thrane. Later Cobham purchased Thrane and Thrane.
- Nera Telecommunications Ltd (broadband access). Provided wireless broadband access, infrastructure, payment solutions, and broadcasting.
- Nera Telecommunications Ltd with HQ in Singapore was the only subsidiary not sold and is today listed in Singapore stock exchange as NeraTel.
