= Universal Instruments Corporation =

- Founded: 1919
- Headquarters: Conklin, New York
- Website: https://www.uic.com/

Universal Instruments Corporation is an electronics technology company located in Conklin, New York. Universal Instruments builds automated machines that enable electronics manufacturing services companies to construct surface-mount technology and through-hole technology circuits, such as SMT placement equipment, insertion mount machines, and machines for advanced semiconductor packaging.

The company also offers smart manufacturing software which provides real-time data to help manufacturers improve their overall operations.

== History ==
Founded in 1919 as a manufacturer of industrial safety pins, the company quickly expanded to serve the growing industrial sector.

During the 1920s and 1930s, it evolved into one of the region’s leading tool and die makers, contributing to the nation’s World War II manufacturing efforts. During this period, the company partnered with Link Aviation to support the production of some of the first flight simulators, a key advancement in aviation training technology.

In the 1950s, the company collaborated with IBM to help develop and market one of the first electronics assembly machines, pioneering innovation that helped shape the modern electronics manufacturing industry.

Today, the company designs, engineers, and assembles advanced electronics assembly technology equipment, and remains the only U.S.-based manufacturer in its field.

Its technology supports production across a wide range of industries, including infrastructure, electric vehicles, defense, renewable energy, home appliances, and smart devices.

Universal Instruments Corporation was acquired by Delta Electronics, Inc. in July 2022.
