= DELBio =

Biotechnology Company

DELBio, INC. (DELBio)
- Industry: Biotechnology
- Founded: 2010
- Headquarters: Taiwan; 252 Shangying Road, Guishan Industrial Zone, Taoyuan County 33341, Taiwan (R.O.C.)
- Key people: Herbert Ho
- Products: Blood glucose meter, blood glucose strip, oximeter and medical devices
- Number of employees: 100
- Website: www.delbio.com.tw

DelBio Inc. which is a branch biotechnology company belonging to Delta Electronics, has been founded in May 2010 and receives the existing Biomedical products and R&D platforms from Delta Electronics Group. They are an OEM for Omron.

== History ==
- 2005 - Delta group has been investing various resources in biomedical products & its R&D.
- 2010 - DelBio Inc. is founded.
- 2010 - Approval by the FDA for 510k

== See also ==
- List of companies of Taiwan
