= Trihedral Engineering =

Canadian industrial automation software company

Trihedral Engineering Limited
- Trade name: Trihedral
- Type: Subsidiary
- Industry: Industrial automation, software development
- Founded: 1986; 40 years ago
- Founder: Glenn Wadden
- Headquarters: Bedford, Nova Scotia, Canada
- Area served: Worldwide
- Key people: Devraj Sen (President); Glenn Wadden (Chief Technology Officer)
- Products: VTScada
- Parent: Delta Electronics
- Website: www.vtscada.com

Trihedral Engineering Limited, commonly known as Trihedral, is a Canadian software company headquartered in Bedford, Nova Scotia. Founded in 1986, the company develops industrial monitoring and control software, primarily its VTScada supervisory control and data acquisition (SCADA) platform. Its software is used in sectors including water and wastewater management, oil and gas, power generation, manufacturing and transportation.

Trihedral was independently owned until November 2020, when it was acquired by Taiwanese electronics manufacturer Delta Electronics for approximately C$45 million. The company continued operating under its existing name following the acquisition.

== History ==
=== Founding and early development ===
Trihedral Engineering was founded in 1986 by Glenn Wadden in Bedford, Nova Scotia. The company initially operated from Wadden's home before expanding into commercial premises. Its early business focused on software for industrial monitoring and control systems.

In 1988, Trihedral introduced WEB, an early SCADA software package developed for the MS-DOS operating system. The software was subsequently adapted for Microsoft Windows and renamed Visual Tag System (VTS) in 1997.

During the 1990s, the company expanded internationally. In 1998, it established a subsidiary in Aberdeen, Scotland, serving industrial customers in the United Kingdom and European markets.

=== Expansion and VTScada ===
The company subsequently developed VTScada, an integrated monitoring and control platform incorporating telemetry, alarm management and historical data recording. The product became particularly associated with municipal water and wastewater systems, alongside applications in energy production and industrial facilities.

In 2007, Trihedral established a United States subsidiary in Orlando, Florida, expanding its North American operations.

By 2013, the company had developed an international customer base and maintained operations in Canada, the United States and the United Kingdom. A profile published by The Chronicle Herald described its growth from a home-based business into an international supplier of industrial monitoring software.

=== Acquisition by Delta Electronics ===
On 30 May 2020, Delta Electronics announced an agreement to acquire Trihedral Engineering Limited through its wholly owned subsidiary Delta Electronics (Netherlands) B.V. The announced transaction was valued at approximately C$45 million.

The acquisition was completed on 4 November 2020, with Delta acquiring 100% of Trihedral's shares. Delta identified the acquisition as part of its strategy to expand its industrial automation and systems integration business, combining its industrial hardware portfolio with Trihedral's SCADA software.

Following the transaction, Trihedral retained its name and management team. Delta stated that it intended to use its international sales and service network to expand the availability of VTScada.

=== Leadership transition ===
In June 2026, Trihedral announced that Devraj Sen would succeed founder Glenn Wadden as company president, effective 1 July 2026. Wadden moved into the position of Chief Technology Officer.

Sen joined Trihedral as a co-operative education student in 2000 and subsequently worked in software development and engineering management. He became Chief Technology Officer in 2022 before his appointment as president.

== Products ==
=== VTScada ===
VTScada is a Windows-based human–machine interface (HMI) and supervisory control and data acquisition (SCADA) software platform developed by Trihedral Engineering. It is designed to monitor and control industrial processes and geographically distributed infrastructure.

The software communicates with field equipment such as programmable logic controllers (PLCs), remote terminal units (RTUs), sensors and other industrial devices. Operators can use graphical displays to monitor equipment, review historical information, respond to alarms and issue control commands.

The platform incorporates several functions commonly associated with industrial SCADA systems, including:

- Data acquisition and communication: Collection of operational data from industrial devices using supported communication protocols.
- Human–machine interfaces: Graphical displays for process visualization, monitoring and control.
- Historical data management: Recording and retrieval of process information using a built-in historian.
- Alarm and event management: Detection, logging, acknowledgement and notification of operational alarms and events.
- Redundancy: Support for backup servers and failover configurations intended to maintain system availability.
- Application version control: Recording and management of changes to application configurations.
- Remote access: Thin-client interfaces that allow authorized users to access applications remotely.
- Reporting and trending: Tools for displaying, analyzing and exporting historical process data.

These capabilities are documented in the product's technical documentation.

VTScada is used in both centralized industrial facilities and distributed systems, where remote equipment may communicate over wired, wireless or telecommunications networks.

=== Software development and releases ===
Trihedral maintains VTScada through major releases and incremental software updates. The company publishes release notes describing changes to device communications, application functionality and software maintenance.

As of November 2026, version 12.2 was the latest major version in general release. Updates during 2026 included changes to industrial device drivers, communication capabilities and application management.

The platform also includes tools for managing application security, user access and operational audit records.

== Applications ==
Trihedral's software has been deployed in public utilities and industrial infrastructure, including municipal water systems, oil and gas facilities, manufacturing plants and transportation-related installations.

=== Water and wastewater ===
Municipal water and wastewater infrastructure represents a significant application area for VTScada. Such installations use SCADA software to monitor and control pumping stations, treatment facilities, storage reservoirs and distribution networks.

In 2015, the City of Sacramento, California, approved an agreement concerning an upgrade to its Department of Utilities SCADA system using VTScada. The agreement covered a system supporting up to 500,000 data points.

Miami-Dade County, Florida, has also procured Trihedral software licensing, maintenance and professional services for water and sewer infrastructure.

=== Energy and manufacturing ===
VTScada has been used in oil and gas operations, including offshore installations in the North Sea. A 2013 profile in Progress magazine described Trihedral's involvement in North Sea oil production monitoring and industrial automation projects.

The same publication identified Toyota's manufacturing operations in Kentucky among the company's industrial customers.

=== Transportation and public safety ===
Trihedral has supplied monitoring and control software for transportation and public safety applications. Reported installations have included systems associated with Halifax Stanfield International Airport and Shannon Airport, as well as emergency response infrastructure.

The software has also been used in fire station alerting systems, where industrial monitoring and communications technology is applied to emergency dispatch operations.

== Operations ==
Trihedral is headquartered in Bedford, Nova Scotia, and operates within Delta Electronics' industrial automation business. The company has maintained operations in Canada, the United States and the United Kingdom.

At the time of the 2020 acquisition, Delta reported that Trihedral served customers in more than 100 countries, with VTScada installations in water treatment, power generation and other industrial infrastructure.

The company's activities include software development, technical support, training and engineering services related to industrial monitoring and control systems.

== Recognition ==
Trihedral and its VTScada software have received recognition from industry publications and organizations.

- 2007–2013: Trihedral was included among Nova Scotia's Top Employers, an annual employer recognition program organized by Mediacorp Canada.
- 2015: VTScada 11 was recognized in the HMI software category of Control Engineering magazine's Engineers' Choice Awards program.
- 2021: VTScada received an Engineers' Choice Award in the HMI software category from Control Engineering.
- 2022: Frost & Sullivan recognized Trihedral in its Global Technology Innovation Leadership Award program for SCADA and HMI systems.
- 2023: Trihedral received Frost & Sullivan's Global SCADA Solutions Customer Value Leadership Award.
- 2026: VTScada received a silver distinction in the Control Platforms category of Control Engineering magazine's Product of the Year awards.

== See also ==
- Supervisory control and data acquisition
- Industrial control system
- Industrial automation
- Human–machine interface
- Industrial internet of things
- Delta Electronics
