= Point-to-point construction =

Making an electronic circuit by directly connecting the leads of the components

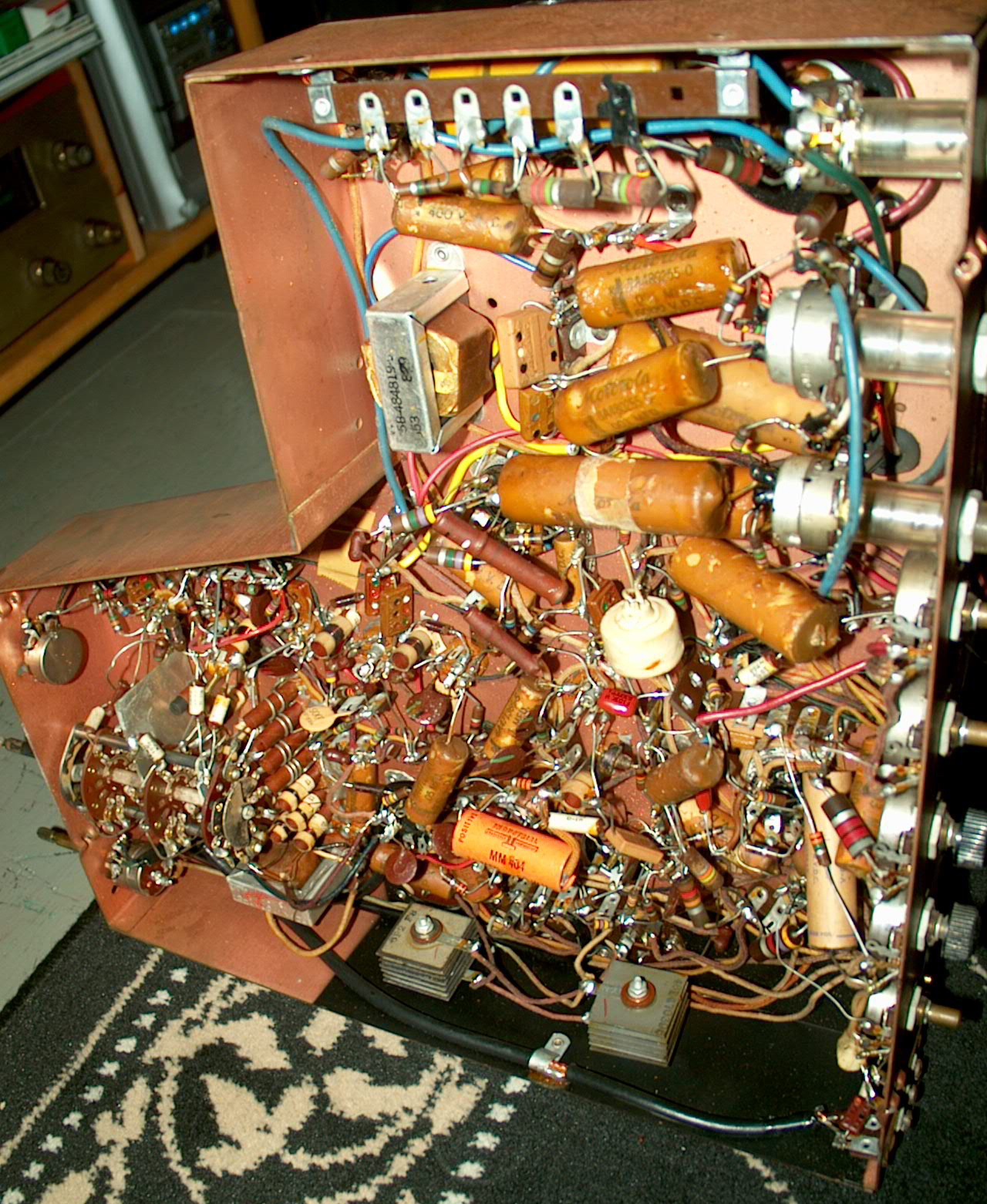
Underside of the chassis of a 1948 Motorola VT-71 7" television, showing the complexity of the point to point wiring.

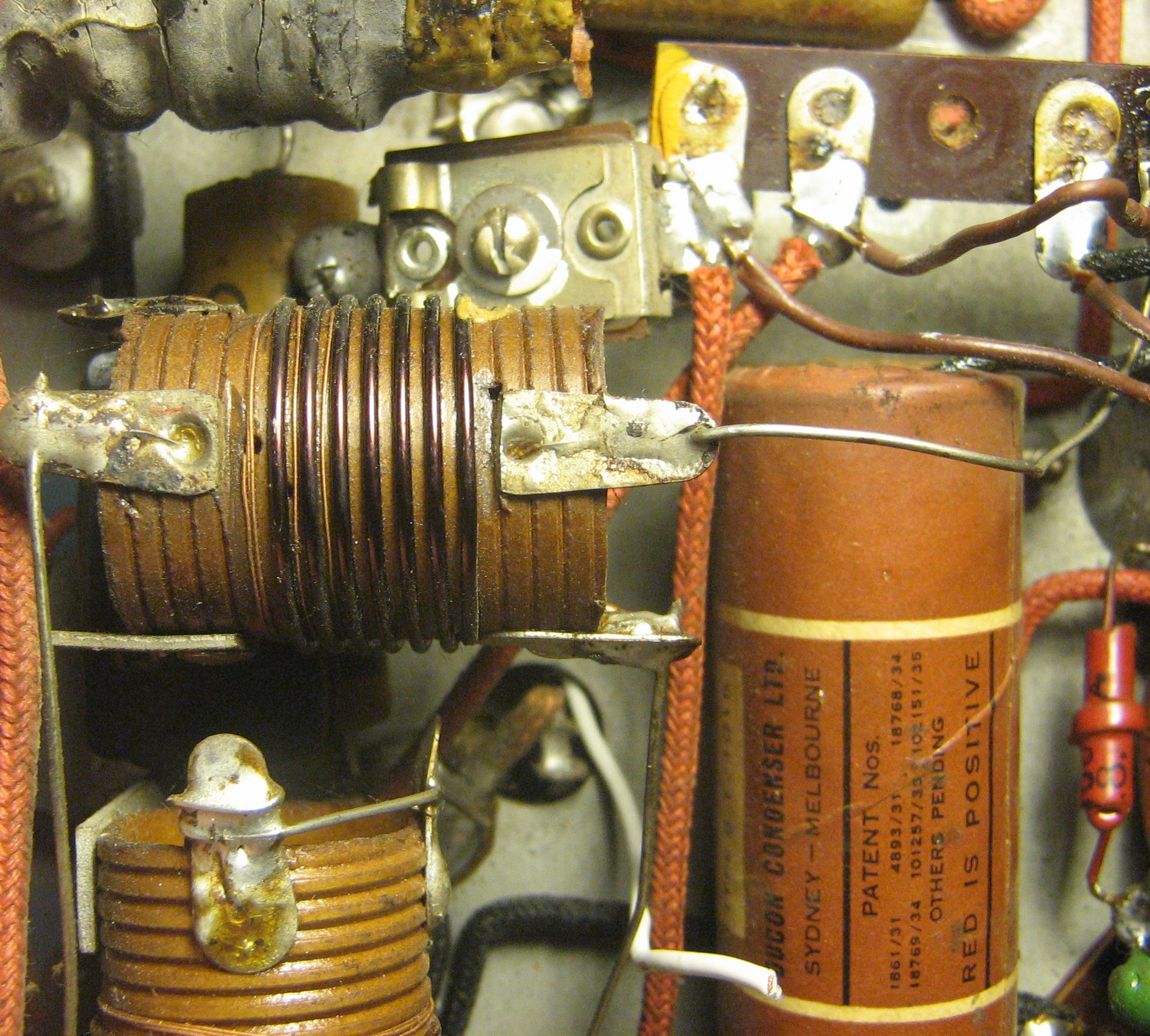
Section of a typical Australian late 1930s radio, showing the point to point construction between components.

In electronics, point-to-point construction is a non-automated technique for constructing circuits which was widely used before the use of printed circuit boards (PCBs) and automated assembly gradually became widespread following their introduction in the 1950s. Circuits using thermionic valves (vacuum tubes) were relatively large, relatively simple (the number of large, hot, expensive devices which needed replacing was minimised), and used large sockets, all of which made the PCB less obviously advantageous than with later complex semiconductor circuits. Point-to-point construction is still widespread in power electronics, where components are bulky and serviceability is a consideration, and to construct prototype equipment with few or heavy electronic components. A common practice, especially in older point-to-point construction, is to use the leads of components such as resistors and capacitors to bridge as much of the distance between connections as possible, reducing the need to add additional wire between the components.

Before point-to-point connection, electrical assemblies used screws or wire nuts to hold wires to an insulating wooden or ceramic board. The resulting devices were prone to fail from corroded contacts, or mechanical loosening of the connections. Early premium marine radios, especially from Marconi, sometimes used welded copper in the bus-bar circuits, but this was expensive. The crucial invention was to apply soldering to electrical assembly. In soldering, an alloy of tin and lead (and/or other metals), known as solder, is melted and adheres to other, nonmolten metals, such as copper or tinned steel. Solder makes a strong electrical and mechanical connection.

Point-to-point wiring is not suitable for automated assembly (though see wire wrap, a similar method that is) and is carried out manually, making it both more expensive and more susceptible to wiring errors than PCBs, as connections are determined by the person doing assembly rather than by an etched circuit board. For production, rather than prototyping, errors can be minimised by carefully designed operating procedures.

An intermediate form of construction uses terminal strips (sometimes called "tag boards"), eyelet boards or turret boards. Note that if components are arranged on boards with tags, eyelets or turrets at both ends and wires going to the next components, then the construction is correctly called tag, eyelet or turret construction respectively, as the components are not going from point to point. Although cordwood construction can be wired in a similar way the density means that component placement is usually fixed by a substrate that components are inserted into.

== Terminal strip construction ==
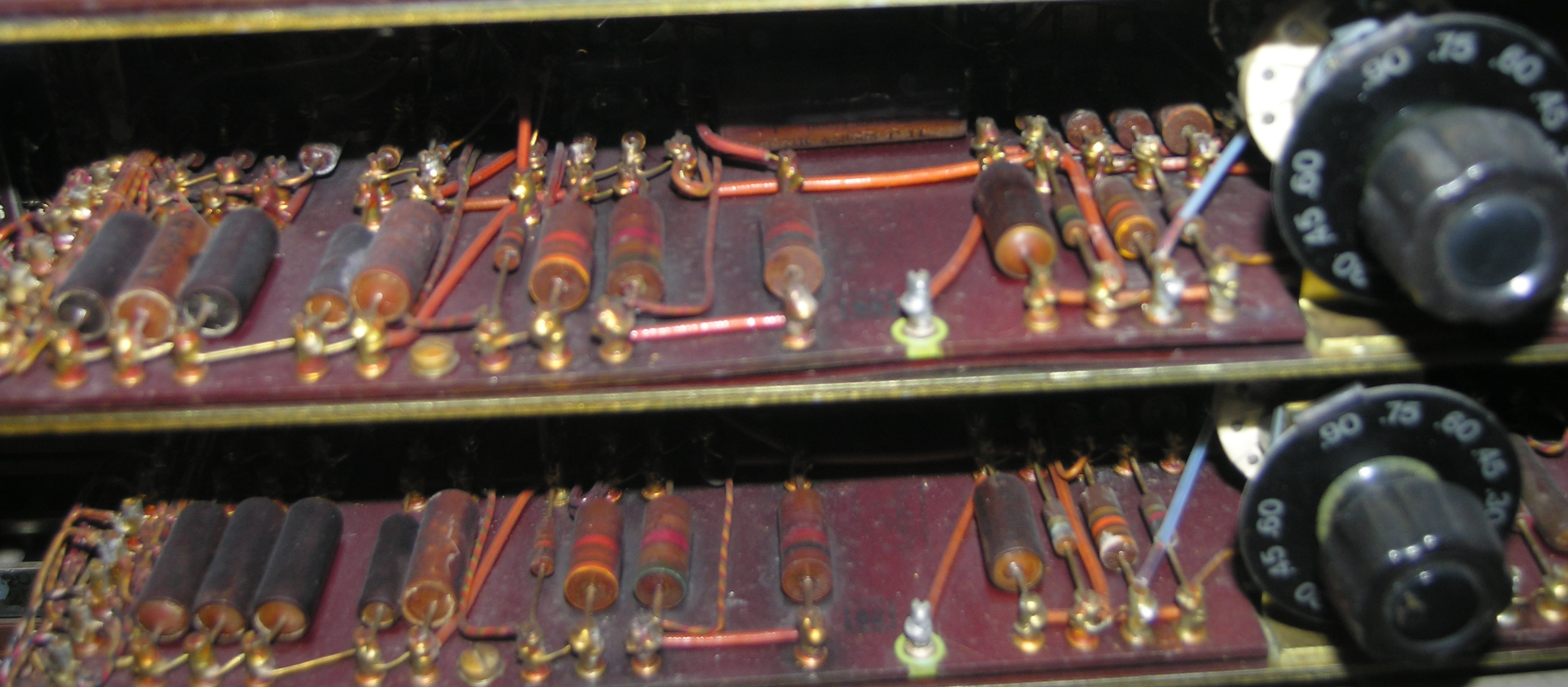
Point-to-point construction of military radio equipment

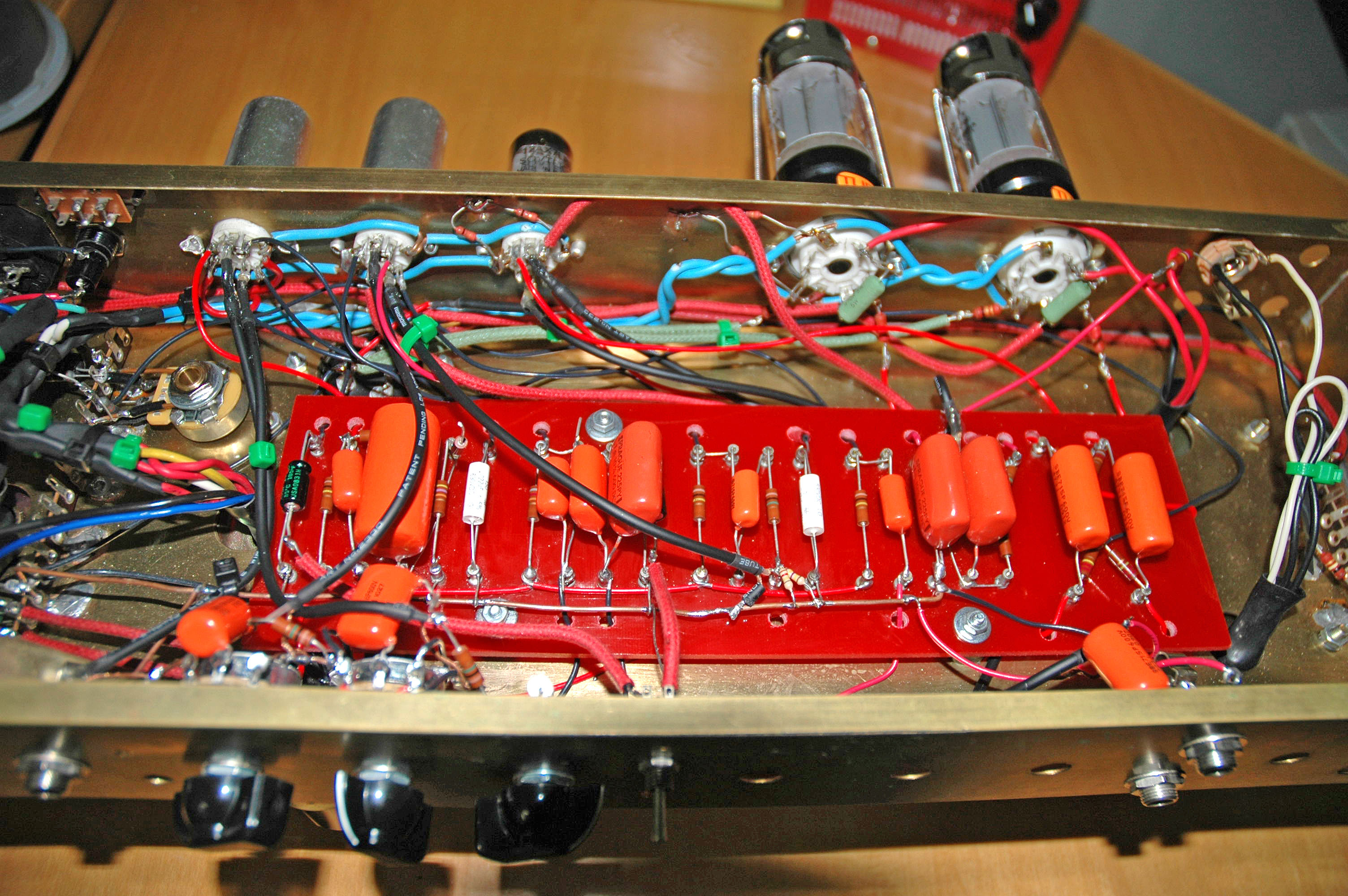
Point to point wiring on a homemade tube amplifier circuit.

Terminal strip construction, which is often referred to as point-to-point construction within the tube guitar amplifier community, uses terminal strips (also called "tag boards"). A terminal strip has stamped tin-plated copper terminals, each with a hole through which wire ends could be pushed, fitted on an insulating strip, usually made of a cheap, heat-resistant material such as synthetic-resin bonded paper (FR-2), or bakelite reinforced with cotton. The insulator has an integral mounting bracket, sometimes electrically connected to one or more of the stamped loops to ground them to the chassis.

The chassis was constructed first, from sheet metal or wood. Insulated terminal strips were then riveted, nailed or screwed to the underside or interior of the chassis. Transformers, large capacitors, tube sockets and other large components were mounted to the top of the chassis. Their wires were led through holes to the underside or interior. The ends of lengths of wire or wire-ended components such as capacitors and resistors were pushed through the terminals, and usually looped and twisted. When all wires to be connected had been fitted to the terminal, they were soldered together (and to the terminal).

Professional electronics assemblers used to operate from books of photographs and follow an exact assembly sequence to ensure that they did not miss any components. This process is labor-intensive, subject to error and not suitable for automated production. Even after the introduction of printed circuit boards, it did not require laying out and manufacturing circuit boards.

Point-to-point and terminal strip construction continued to be used for some vacuum tube equipment even after the introduction of printed circuit boards. The heat of the tubes can degrade the circuit boards and cause them to become brittle and break. Circuit board degradation is often seen on inexpensive tube radios produced in the 1960s, especially around the hot output and rectifier tubes. American manufacturer Zenith continued to use point-to-point wiring in its tube-based television sets until the early 1970s.

Some audiophile equipment, such as amplifiers, continues to be point-to-point wired using terminal pins, often in very small quantities. In this application modern point-to-point wiring is often used as a marketing design feature rather than a result of the economics of very-small-scale production.

Sometimes true point-to-point wiring—without terminal strips—with very short connections, is still used at very high radio frequencies (in the gigahertz range) to minimise stray capacitance and inductance; the capacitance between a circuit-board trace and some other conductor, and the inductance of a short track, become significant or dominant at high frequencies. In some cases careful PCB layout on a substrate with good high-frequency properties (e.g., ceramic) is sufficient. An example of this design is illustrated in an application note describing an avalanche transistor-based generator of pulses with risetime of a fraction of a nanosecond; the (few) critical components are connected directly to each other and to the output connector with the shortest possible leads.

Particularly in complex equipment, wired circuits are often laid out as a "ladder" of side-by-side components, which need connecting to ladders or components by wire links. A good layout minimizes such links and wiring complexity, often approaching that of direct point-to-point. Amongst complex devices, the pre-PCB Tektronix vacuum-tube oscilloscopes stand out for their very well-designed point-to-point wiring.

If parasitic effects are significant, point-to-point and terminal strip wiring have variable parasitic components, while the inductance and capacitance due to a PCB are the same for all samples and can be compensated for reliably which may be essential for some RF circuits. In some heavily optimised point-to-point RF constructions the circuit can be tuned by bending wires around.

Placing the completed unit in an enclosure protects the circuit from its environment, and users from electrical hazards.

A few large brand names still use terminal strip-type point-to-point boards, but usually for special product lines. Electric guitar amplifier manufacturer Marshall have reissued some of their older models, using this type of construction as a design feature, although their standard products have long used PCBs. Thermionic valve equipment usually does not have the valves mounted on the PCB in order to avoid heat damage, but instead use PCBs for the wiring, achieving the economy of mass-produced PCBs without the heat damage.

== Breadboard ==
Prototypes which are subject to modification are often not made on PCBs, using instead breadboard construction. Historically this could be literally a breadboard, a wooden board with components attached to it and joined up with wire. More recently the term is applied to a board of thin insulating material with holes at standard 0.1-inch pitch; components are pushed through the holes to anchor them, and point-to-point wired on the other side of the board. A type of breadboard specifically for prototyping has this layout, but with strips of metal spring contacts beneath a grid of holes into which components are pushed to make electrical connections like any removable connector. Some portion of the terminals in a straight line in one direction are electrically connected, commonly in groups of 5-10 with multiple groups per row, these may be interspersed with columns that span the height of the board for the more common connections (typically the power supply rails). Such breadboards, and stripboards, fall somewhere between PCBs and point-to-point; they do not require design and manufacture of a PCB, and are as easily modified as a point-to-point setup.

== Stripboard ==
A stripboard is a board with holes in square grid pattern, commonly with a 0.1-inch pitch; all the holes in a straight line are connected by a copper strip as on a PCB. Components are pushed through from the side without strips and soldered in place. The strips can be interrupted by scraping out a section of the copper, stripboard cutters are available for this task which are effectively a drill bit with a handle, they are used by rotating on the holes in a strip.

== "Dead bug" construction ==
Free-form construction can be used in cases where a PCB would be too big or too much work to manufacture for a small number of components. Several methods of construction are used. At one extreme a wiring pen can be used with a perforated board, producing neat and professional results. At the other extreme is "dead bug" style, with the ICs flipped upside-down with their pins sticking up into the air like a dead insect, the leads of components are usually soldered directly to other components where possible, with many small circuits having no added wires. While it is messy-looking, free-form construction can be used to make more compact circuits than other methods. This is often used in BEAM robotics and in RF circuits where component leads must be kept short. This form of construction is used by amateurs for one-off circuits, and also professionally for circuit development, particularly at high frequencies.

For high-frequency work, a grounded solderable metallic base such as the copper side of an unetched printed circuit board can be used as base and ground plane. Information on high-frequency breadboarding and illustrations of dead bug with ground plane construction are in a Linear Technologies application note.

== See also ==
- Wire wrap
