= Through-hole technology =

Circuit board manufacturing technique

Diagram of how through-hole components are mounted

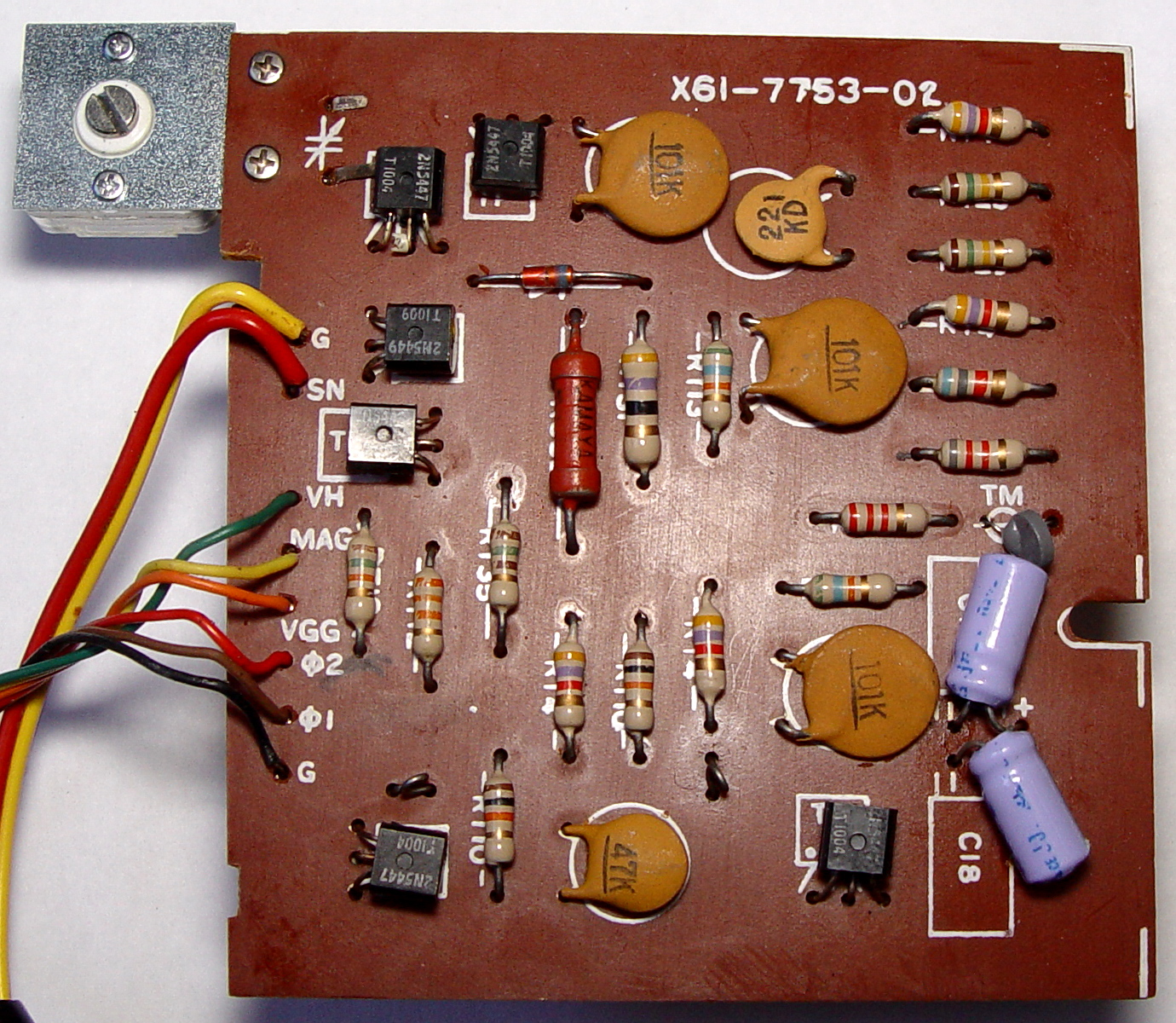
A through-hole circuit board

In electronics, through-hole technology (also spelled "thru-hole") is a manufacturing scheme in which leads on the components are inserted through holes drilled in printed circuit boards (PCB) and soldered to pads on the opposite side, either by manual assembly (hand placement) or by the use of automated insertion mount machines.

== History ==
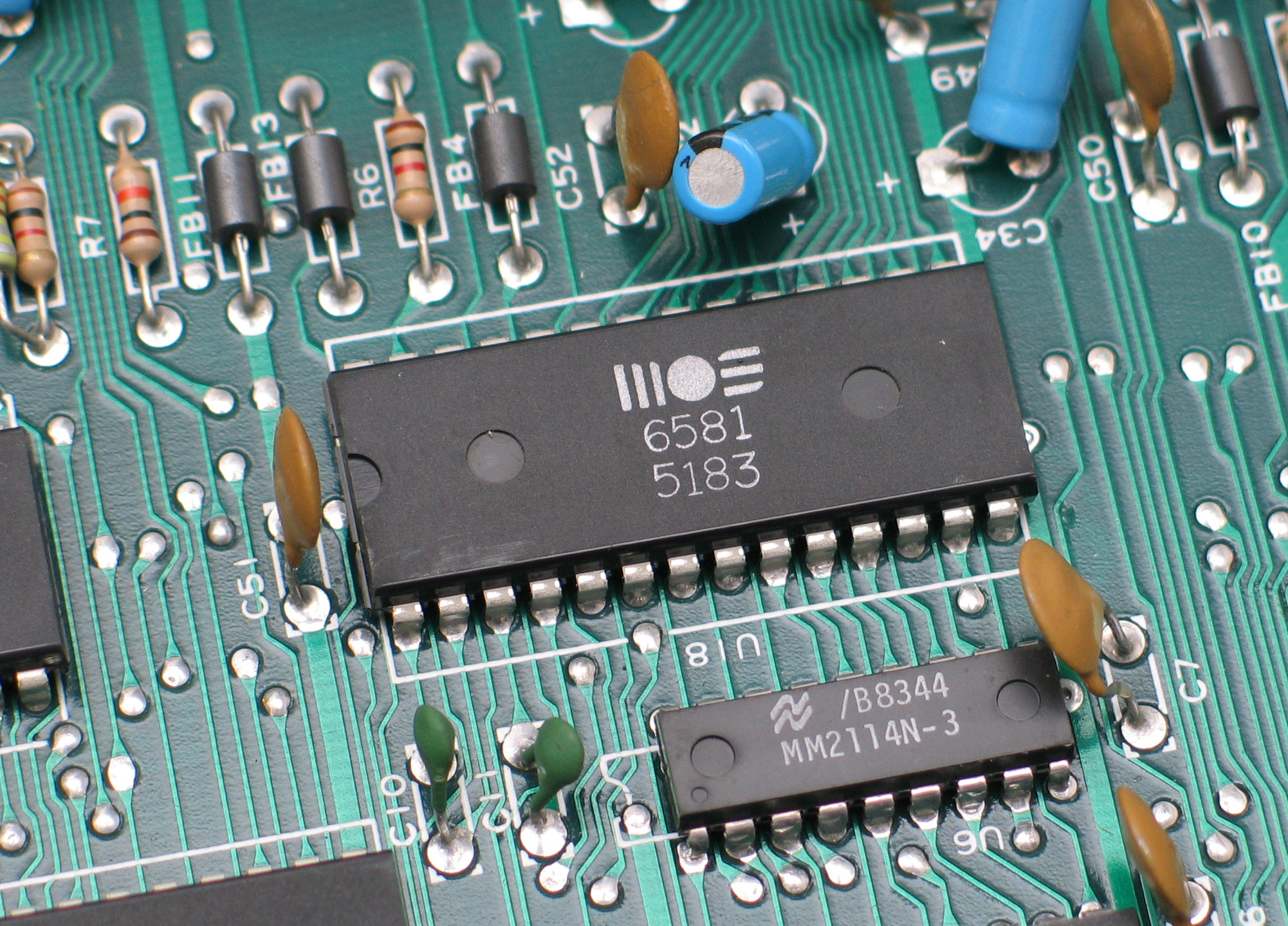
Through-hole devices mounted on the circuit board of a mid-1980s home computer. Axial-lead devices are at upper left, while blue radial-lead capacitors are at upper right

Through-hole technology almost completely replaced earlier electronics assembly techniques such as point-to-point construction. From the second generation of computers in the 1950s until surface-mount technology (SMT) became popular in the mid-1980s, every component on a typical PCB was a through-hole component. PCBs initially had tracks printed on one side only, later both sides, then multi-layer boards were in use. Through holes became plated-through holes (PTH) in order for the components to make contact with the required conductive layers. Plated-through holes are no longer required with SMT boards for making the component connections, but are still used for making interconnections between the layers and in this role are more usually called vias.

== Leads ==
=== Axial and radial leads ===
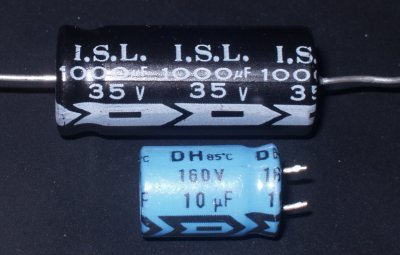
Axial- (top) and radial- (bottom) leaded electrolytic capacitors

Components with wire leads are generally used on through-hole boards. Axial leads protrude from each end of a typically cylindrical or elongated box-shaped component, on the geometrical axis of symmetry. Axial-leaded components resemble wire jumpers in shape, and can be used to span short distances on a board, or even otherwise unsupported through an open space in point-to-point wiring. Axial components do not protrude much above the surface of a board, producing a low-profile or flat configuration when placed "lying down" or parallel to the board.

Radial leads project more or less in parallel from the same surface or aspect of a component package, rather than from opposite ends of the package. Originally, radial leads were defined as more-or-less following a radius of a cylindrical component (such as a ceramic disk capacitor). Over time, this definition was generalized in contrast to axial leads, and took on its current form. When placed on a board, radial components "stand up" perpendicular, occupying a smaller footprint on sometimes-scarce "board real estate", making them useful in many high-density designs. The parallel leads projecting from a single mounting surface gives radial components an overall "plugin nature", facilitating their use in high-speed automated component insertion ("board-stuffing") machines.

When needed, an axial component can be effectively converted into a radial component, by bending one of its leads into a "U" shape so that it ends up close to and parallel with the other lead. Extra insulation with heat-shrink tubing may be used to prevent shorting out on nearby components. Conversely, a radial component can be pressed into service as an axial component by separating its leads as far as possible, and extending them into an overall length-spanning shape. These improvisations are often seen in breadboard or prototype construction, but are deprecated for mass production designs. This is because of difficulties in use with automated component placement machinery, and poorer reliability because of reduced vibration and mechanical shock resistance in the completed assembly.

=== Multiple lead devices ===
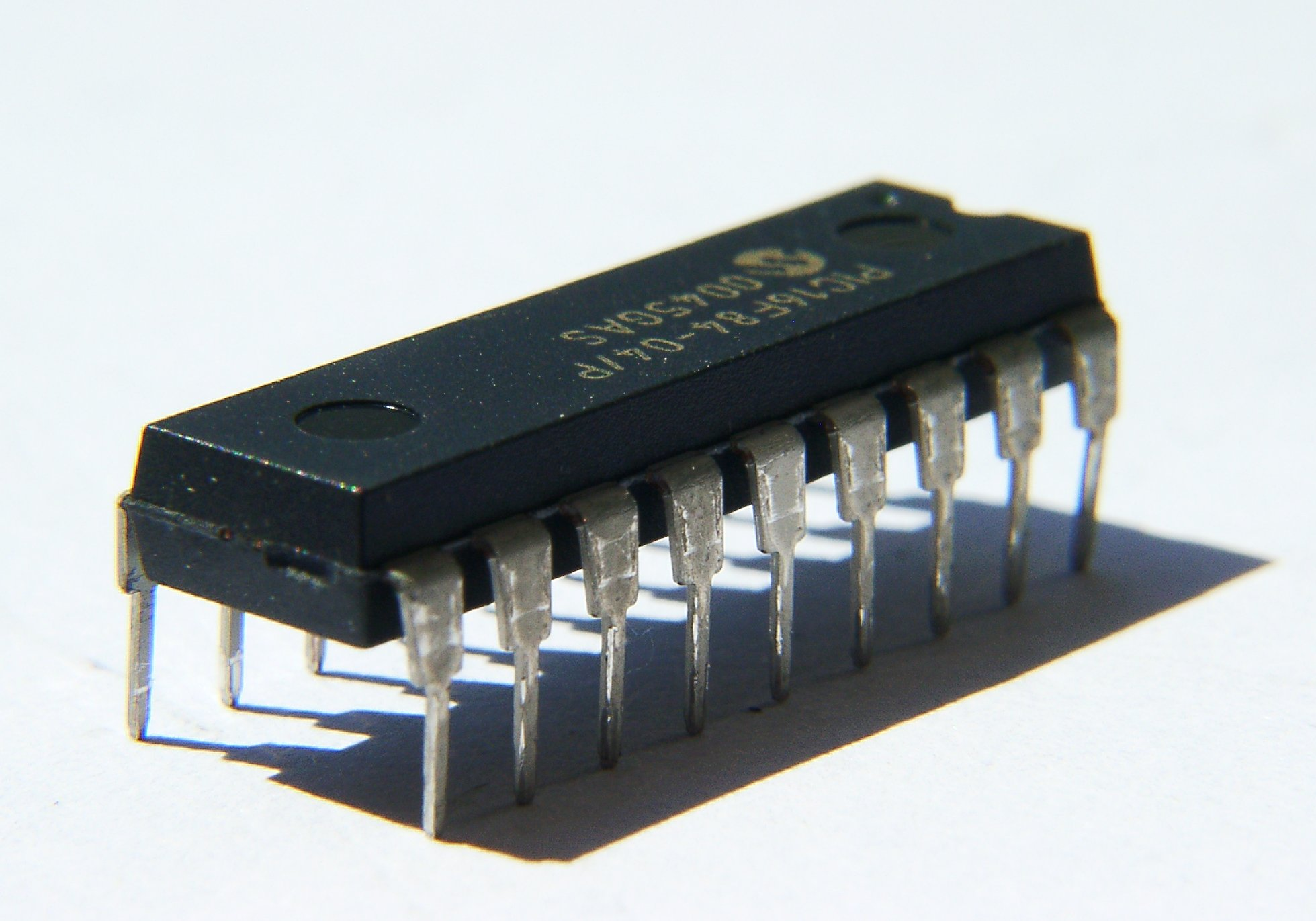
Components like integrated circuits can have upwards of dozens of leads, or pins

For electronic components with two or more leads, for example, diodes, transistors, ICs, or resistor packs, a range of standard-sized semiconductor packages are used, either directly onto the PCB or via a socket.

== Characteristics ==
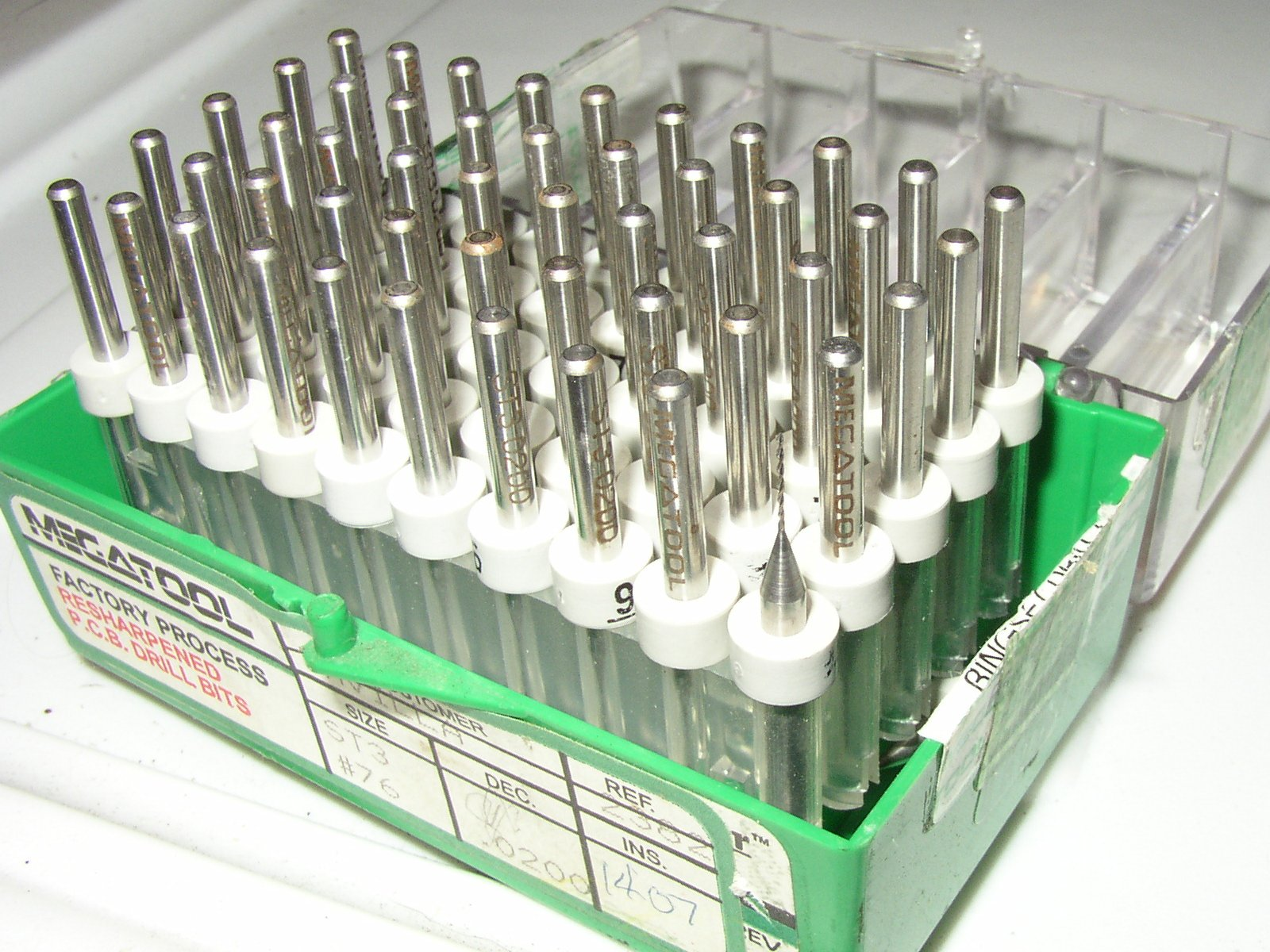
A box of drill bits used for making holes in printed circuit boards. While tungsten-carbide bits are very hard, they eventually wear out or break. Making holes is a considerable part of the cost of a through-hole printed circuit board.

While through-hole mounting provides strong mechanical bonds when compared to SMT techniques, the additional drilling required makes the boards more expensive to produce. They also limit the available routing area for signal traces on layers immediately below the top layer on multilayer boards since the holes must pass through all layers to the opposite side. To that end, through-hole mounting techniques are now usually reserved for bulkier or heavier components such as electrolytic capacitors or semiconductors in larger packages such as the TO-220 that require the additional mounting strength, or for components such as plug connectors or electromechanical relays that require great strength in support.

Design engineers often prefer the larger through-hole rather than surface mount parts when prototyping, because they can be easily used with breadboard sockets. However, high-speed or high-frequency designs may require SMT technology to minimize stray inductance and capacitance in wire leads, which would impair circuit function. Ultra-compact designs may also dictate SMT construction, even in the prototype phase of design.

Through-hole components are ideal for prototyping circuits with breadboards using microprocessors such as Arduino or PICAXE. These components are large enough to be easy to use and solder by hand.

== See also ==
- Point-to-point construction
- Board-to-board connector
- Surface-mount technology
- Via (electronics)
