= Delta Electronics =

Taiwanese computer fan and switching power supply manufacturer

Delta Electronics, Inc.
- Native name: 台達電子工業股份有限公司
- Type: Public
- Traded as: TWSE: 2308
- Industry: Electrical equipment
- Founded: April 4, 1971; 55 years ago Reorganized on 20 August 1975
- Founder: Bruce CH Cheng
- Headquarters: RueyKuang Road 186, Neihu District, Taipei (Business) Xingbang Road 1 31, Guishan District, Taoyuan, Taiwan
- Key people: Bruce CH Cheng (Hon. Chairman); Hai Ying Jun "Yancey" (Chairman); Cheng Ping (CEO)
- Products: data center infrastructure; electronic components; embedded power supplies; thermal fan management; capital communications components; industrial automation; telecom power systems; uninterrupted power systems; renewable energy; vehicle electronics; electric vehicle charging equipment; networking Products; video and imaging Systems; LED lighting; medical devices; Innergie Consumer Power Products; Vivitek HD Projectors; Eltek Power Systems; Delta Controls building automation
- Revenue: ▲US$17.9 billion (2025)
- Operating income: ▲US$2.7 billion (2025)
- Net income: ▲US$2.0 billion (2025)
- Total assets: ▲US$18.7 billion (2025)
- Total equity: ▲US$9.0 billion (2025)
- Number of employees: ▲83,000 (2025)
- Website: www.deltaww.com

Delta Electronics, Inc. (Chinese: 台達電子; also known as DELTA or Delta Electronics) is a Taiwanese electronics manufacturing company. Its headquarters are in Neihu, Taipei. It is known for its DC industrial and computer fans, data center rectifiers, data center liquid cooling systems and switching power supplies. The company operates approximately 200 facilities worldwide, including manufacturing, sales, and R&D centers.

== Overview ==
Delta is a major supplier of power components to Apple and Tesla.

Delta is a member of the Taiwan Climate Partnership. The company is committed to reaching net-zero carbon emissions.

== Environmental, social and governance ==
Delta has long history of being a leader in the environmental, social, and governance (ESG) space. Among companies based in Taiwan, it was the first to issue a Corporate Social Responsibility (ESG) report in 2005, and publishes a new report annually. It has been listed on the Dow Jones Sustainability Indices for 14 consecutive years and has achieved a top 10% S&P Global CSA score in its most recent 2024 ranking.

Delta was named 24th in Time Magazine's 2024 ranking of the world's most sustainable companies. In addition, Delta was awarded double A-list ratings for the third time in a row by the CDP (formerly Carbon Disclosure Project) in their most recent 2024 ratings.

The company has engaged in a joint project with the National Museum of Marine Science and Technology to engage in coral reef restoration off the northeast coast of Taiwan. Through an ambitious diving program helmed by forty volunteer divers who are also Delta employees, the company plans to transplant and breed over a thousand corals to the marine protected areas around Taiwan. The coral breeding project adopts cryopreservation techniques and Delta's own LED lamps for restoration of the delicate ecosystem.

Delta's U.S. headquarters in Fremont, California, was built in 2016. It showcases many of Delta's own green energy and building automation products in its build. Prominently, it features a geothermal heat pump system and a full rooftop solar system. Delta's own products are most visible through the photovoltaic power generating systems on the roof and carports, the electric vehicle charging stations throughout the property, and managed LED lighting systems. The building was awarded a LEED Zero Energy certification in 2022, an upgrade from the LEED Platinum designation it achieved at the time it was built. At the time of completion, it was the first green building with net-zero energy consumption in the city of Fremont and only the second in the San Francisco Bay Area.

== History ==
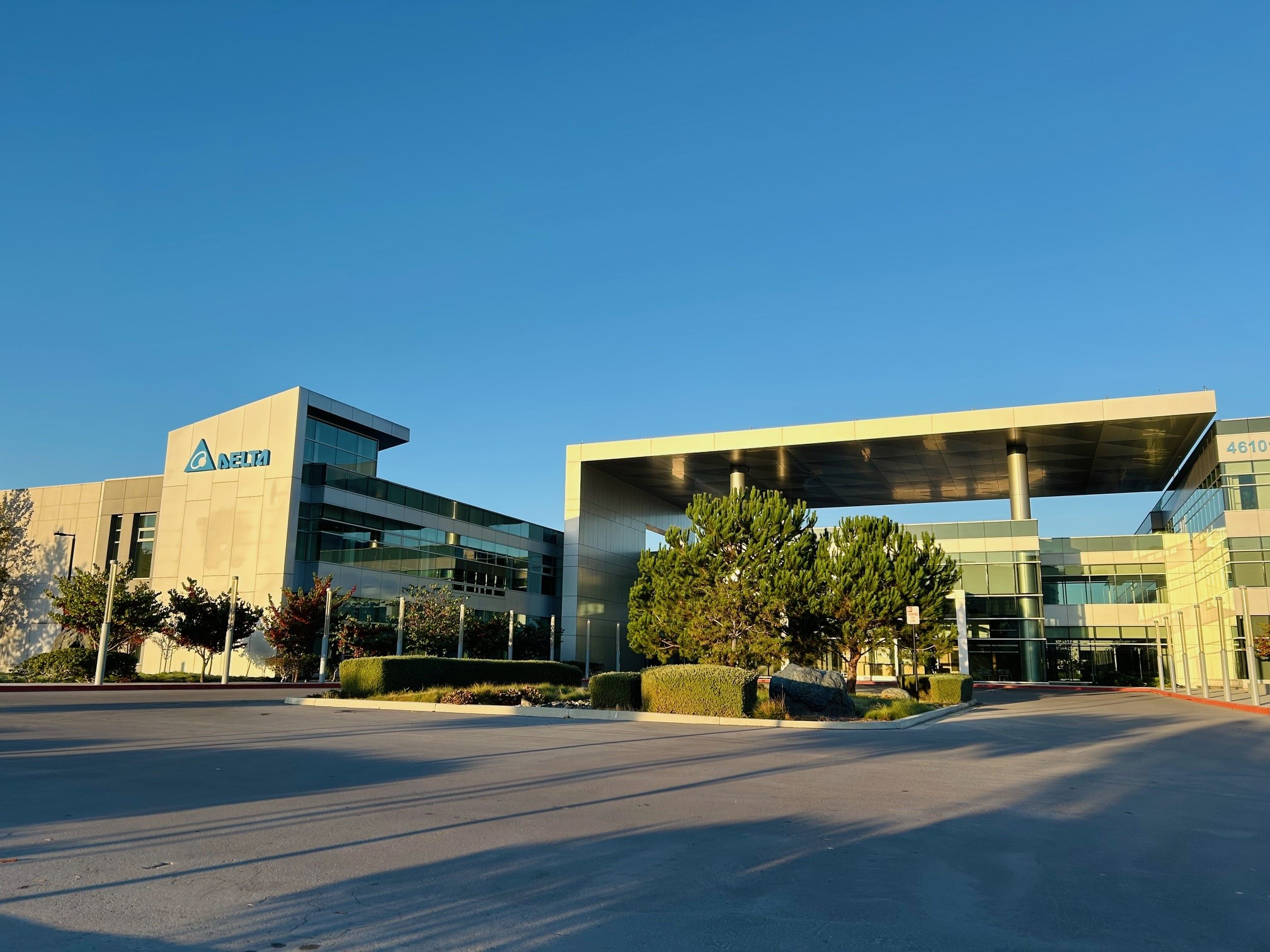
Delta Americas headquarters. LEED Zero Energy building in Fremont, CA

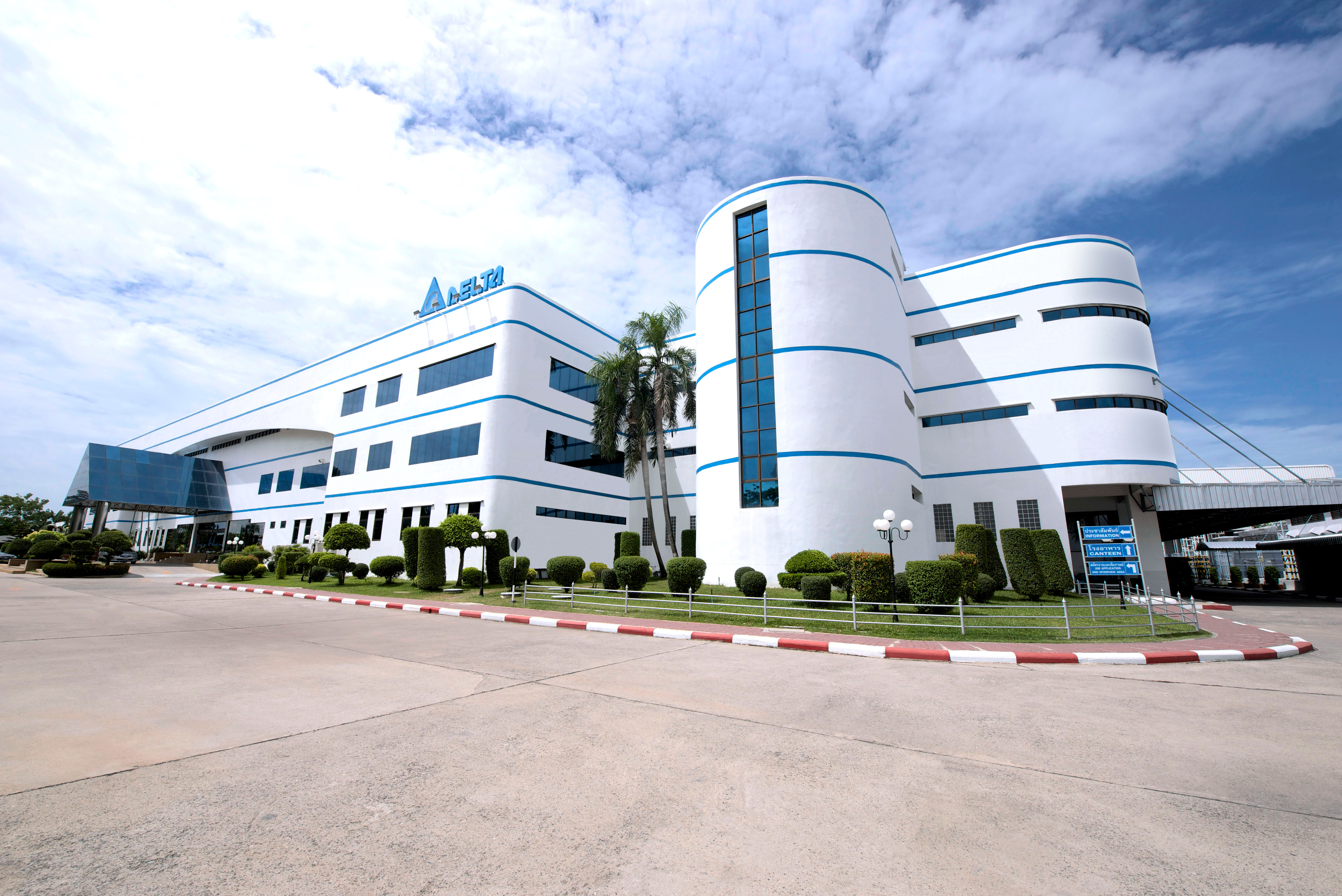
Delta Electronics (Thailand) PCL.

Delta Electronics was founded in 1971 in Xinzhuang Town, Taipei County (now Xinzhuang District, New Taipei City). Its first products were TV deflection coils, electronic components and winding magnetic components. It is also a supplier of cooling components.

As a result of the US-China trade war, Delta cut its headcount in China by more than half and expanded operations in India and Southeast Asia.

In December 2021, the company announced the acquisition of Universal Instruments Corporation, a United States–based firm, for approximately $89 million. Universal Instruments, which has operated for more than 100 years, continued to operate independently and retained its existing management. The company holds more than 500 patents related to automation technologies.

In July 2022, Delta announced that it would be expanding their Plano, Texas facility with the addition of a 400,000-square-foot manufacturing, research, and development hub that could require more employees and operate on 100% renewable energy by 2030.

In 2025, Delta Electronics and the Indian Institute of Science developed a new EV charging technology that connects more efficiently to the power grid by removing the need for large transformers.

== See also ==
- List of companies of Taiwan
