= Wiring pencil =

Tool for making electrical connections

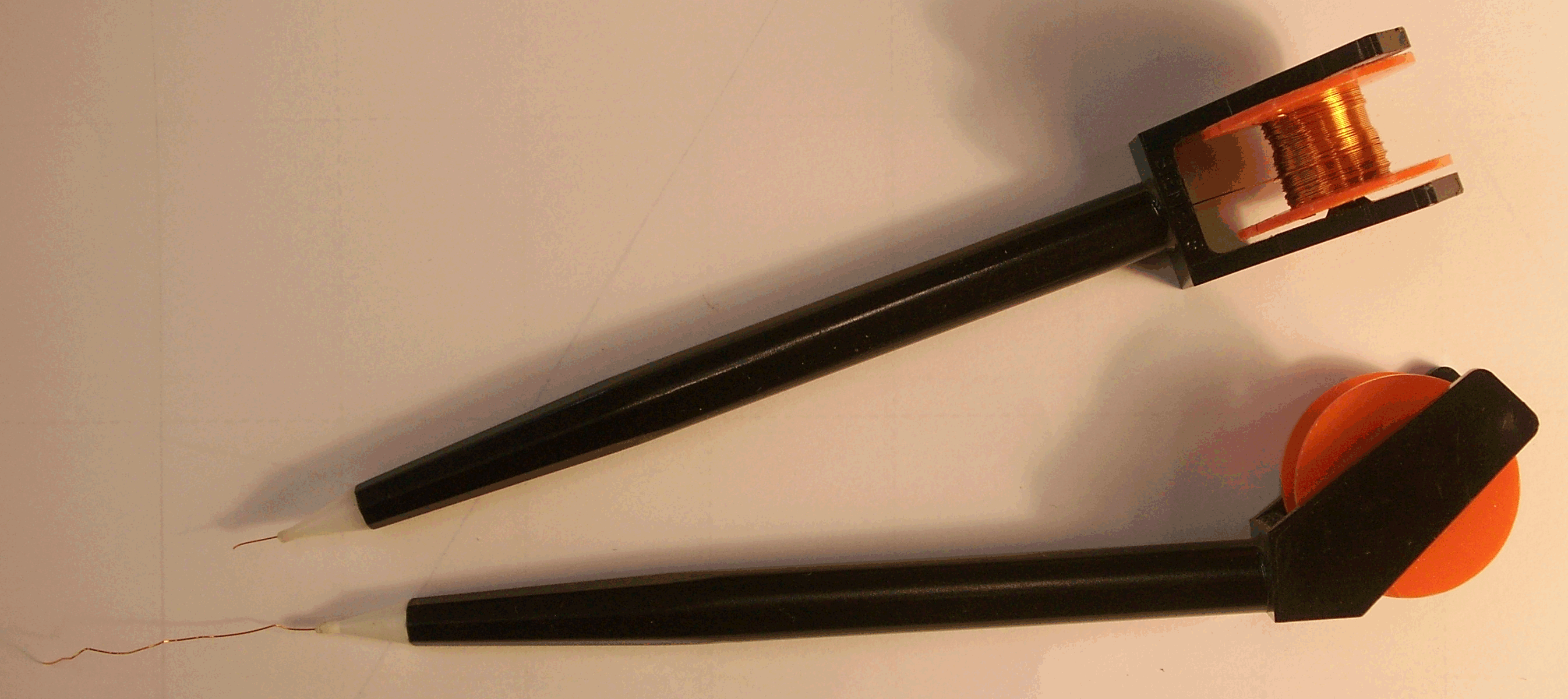
Two wiring pencils

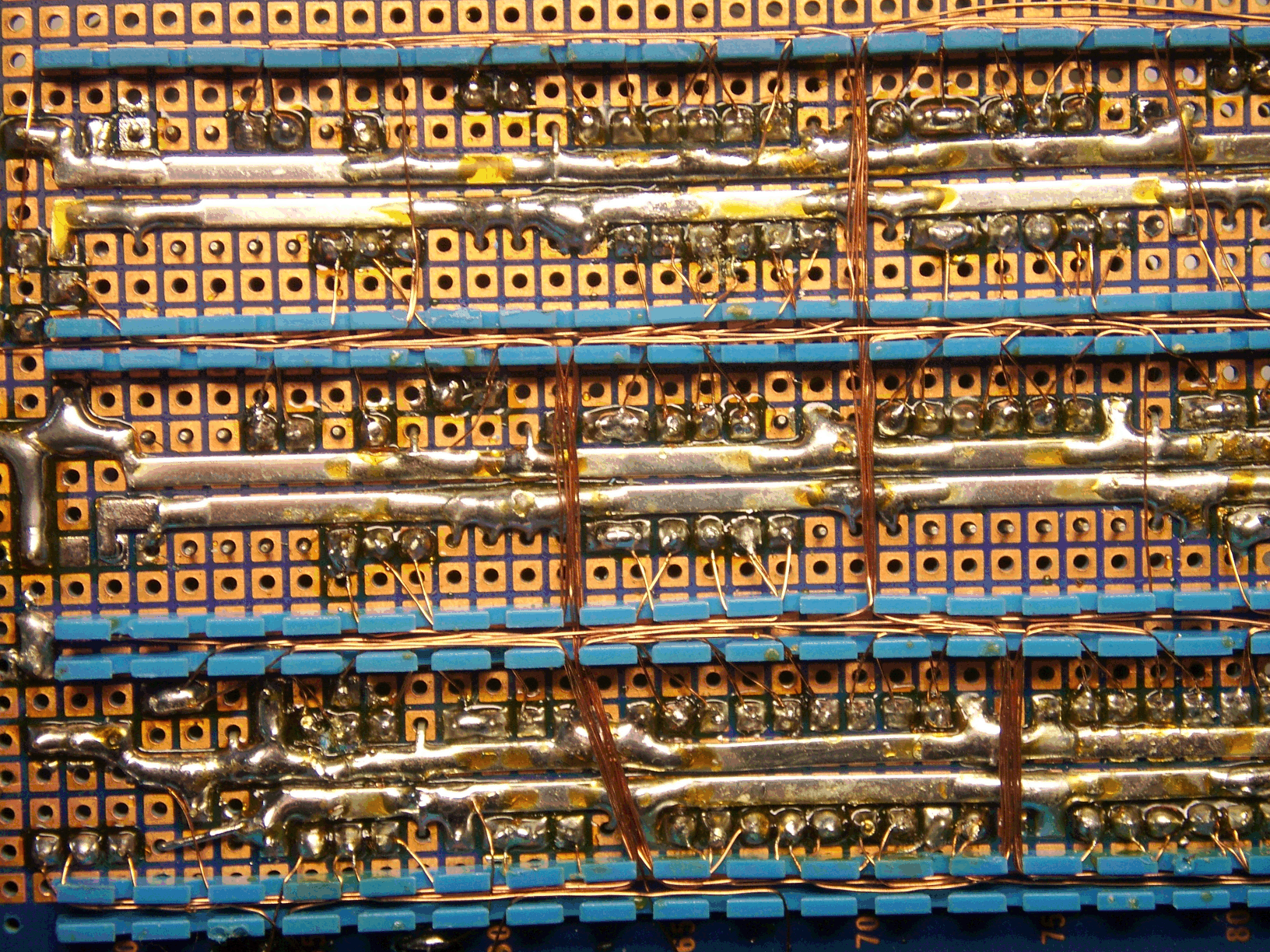
Electronics board made with a wiring pencil

A wiring pencil (often sold under the trade names of Roadrunner or Verowire) is a tool for making electrical connections.

A small reel of insulated copper wire is mounted at the top of the tool. The wire runs down the center of the wiring pencil and through a hardened tip, which is small enough to move between the pins of 0.1" pitch DIL chip, allowing connections to be wrapped and the wire to be led across the circuit board to the next point it's needed.

The wire is coated with a polymer lacquer (commonly referred to as enamel, but not glass-based). Once wrapped, the connections are soldered, the heat of this burning the lacquer away and completing the joint. Insulated wire is normally 38 SWG (0.15 mm), ground connections are sometimes made with uninsulated wire, which is slightly heavier (33 SWG, 0.25 mm).

A well ventilated area and/or fume extraction are very important when carrying out this process due to the toxic fumes. Sometimes, where there are many wires, plastic comb-like structures are used for wire management.

== See also ==
- Wire wrap
- Solderable enamel wire
