= Ceragon =

Networking equipment vendor

Ceragon Networks Ltd.
- Type: Public
- Traded as: Nasdaq: CRNT
- Industry: Telecommunications equipment
- Founded: 1996; 30 years ago
- Headquarters: Tel Aviv, Israel
- Key people: Doron Arazi (CEO)
- Products: Wireless backhaul Microwave and millimeter wave wireless backhaul Private network services
- Revenue: ▲$394.2 million (2024)
- Operating income: ▲$38.7 million (2024)
- Net income: ▲ -$24.1 million (2024)
- Number of employees: 1,056
- Website: ceragon.com

Ceragon Networks Ltd. is a telecommunications equipment company that manufactures point-to-point and point-to-multipoint wireless connectivity systems. The company's products are primarily used for wireless backhaul by mobile network operators, wireless service providers, and private network operators. Ceragon’s systems support transmission across microwave and millimeter wave frequency bands.

== History ==
Ceragon was founded in 1996 under the name Giganet Ltd. The company changed its name to Ceragon Networks Ltd. on September 6, 2000. Ceragon completed its initial public offering on NASDAQ on August 3, 2000, under the ticker symbol CRNT.

Ceragon designs and manufactures high-capacity communication systems for wireless backhaul, mid-haul, and front-haul. The company addresses the segment of the cellular market that connects cell sites to an operator's core network (backhaul), as well as distributed cell site functions located in separate geographical locations (mid-haul and front-haul). Ceragon provides wireless equipment with capacities of up to 40 Gbps and plans to add products based on higher frequency bands to support capacities up to 100 Gbps and beyond. Ceragon markets its products under a range of IP-branded product lines.

Ceragon has sales offices located throughout North and South America, EMEA, and Asia that handle direct sales. Partnerships with distributors, VARs, and system integrators around the world provide an active indirect channel. Its US headquarters was opened in 1999 and its European headquarters in 2000.

Ceragon provides wireless transport solutions, supporting 5G and future-generation architectures and enabling broadband site connectivity to core networks in areas where optic fiber is not feasible.

In December 2023, Ceragon completed the acquisition of Siklu, an Israeli company specializing in millimeter wave wireless solutions. The transaction had an enterprise value of $13-15 million.

In February 2025, Ceragon completed the acquisition of End 2 End Technologies, LLC, a U.S.-based systems integration and software development company serving private networks in oil and gas and utilities markets. The transaction was valued at approximately $8.5 million with potential additional payments based on financial performance milestones.

In 2025, Ceragon Networks earned the top spot in GlobalData's Backhaul Report.

Ceragon operates in over 130 countries. The company has research and development centers in Israel, the United States, Paraguay, India, and Romania.

== Products and services ==
Ceragon manufactures point-to-point and point-to-multipoint wireless transmission systems operating across microwave and millimeter wave frequency bands, including licensed spectrum ranging from 4 GHz to 42 GHz and millimeter-wave spectrum from 57 GHz to 88 GHz. The company offers wireless transmission solutions in multiple configurations and frequency bands, including microwave and millimeter-wave systems.

The company provides solutions for wireless backhaul, private networks, public safety communications, utility networks, and maritime environments. Ceragon also offers managed services including network planning, deployment, monitoring, and maintenance.

Ceragon's technologies are deployed across multiple sectors including telecommunications operator backhaul, public safety and emergency communications, utility smart grid networks, smart city infrastructure, oil and gas connectivity for remote sites, mining operations, and government communications.
