= Lead (electronics) =

Electrical connection consisting of a length of wire or a metal pad

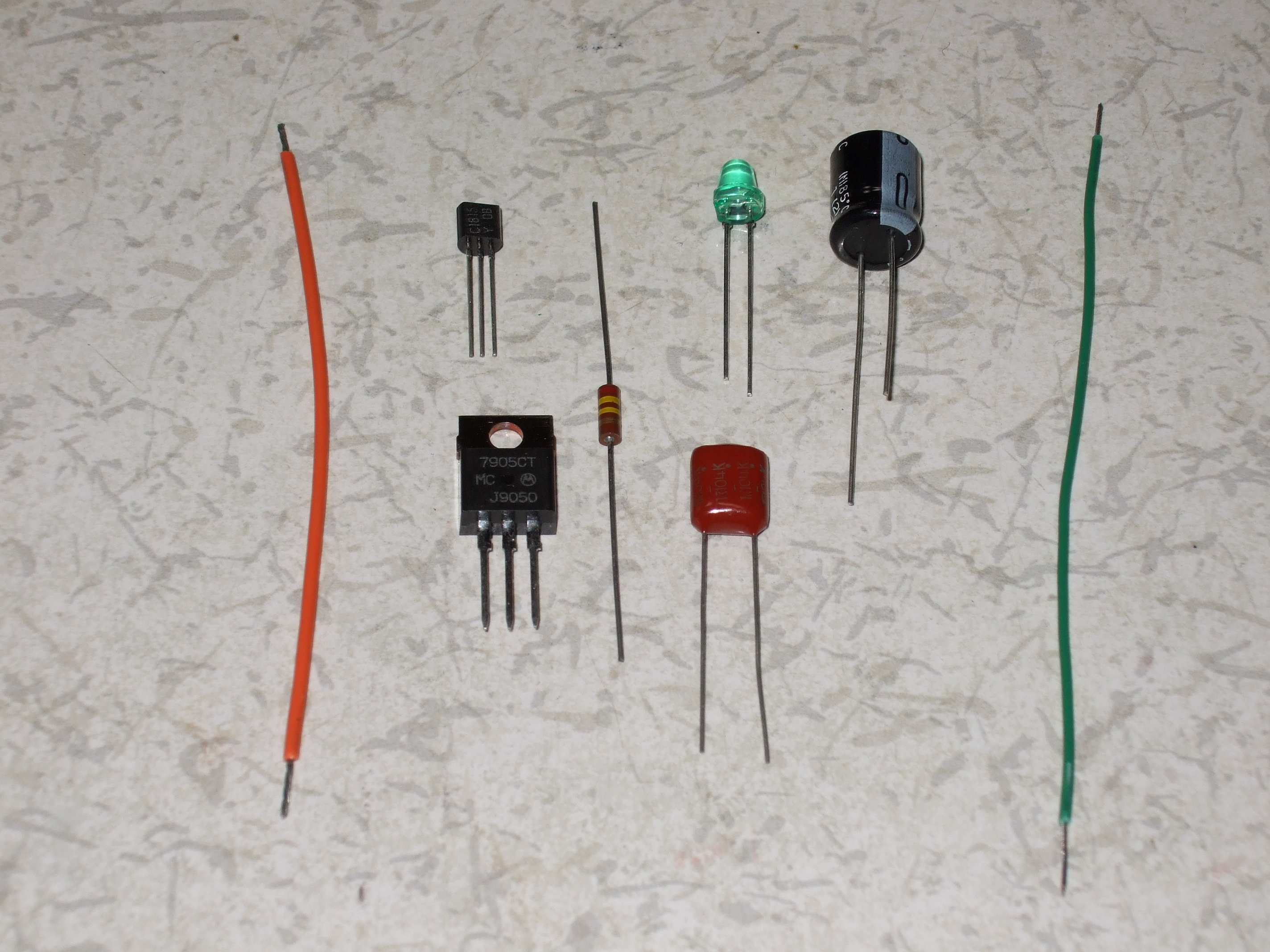
Several kinds of lead wires. A lead wire is a metal wire connected from the electric pole of an electronics part or an electronic component. The lead wire is a coated copper wire, a tinned copper wire or another electrically conductive wire used to connect two locations electrically.

In electronics, a lead (/ˈliːd/) or pin is a piece of metal that is used to transmit electricity to or from a component of a circuit or an external tool, by connecting something else to its terminal. This can be used to transfer power and/or communicate information. The lead or pin can take various shapes: in through-hole technology it is a length of wire, in surface-mount technology it is a pad, in a ball grid array it is a ball/bump, for a multimeter or similar device it is a test probe, and in fields such as electrocardiography it is an electrode. A pin fin heat sink can be used to avoid overheating.

== In microelectronics ==
Simpler electrical components such as capacitors, resistors, and inductors have only two leads, while some integrated circuits can have several hundred or even more than a thousand for the largest ball grid array packages, described by the component's pinout. Integrated circuit pins often either bend under the package body like a letter "J" (J-lead) or come out, down, and form a flat foot for securing to the board (S-lead or gull-lead).

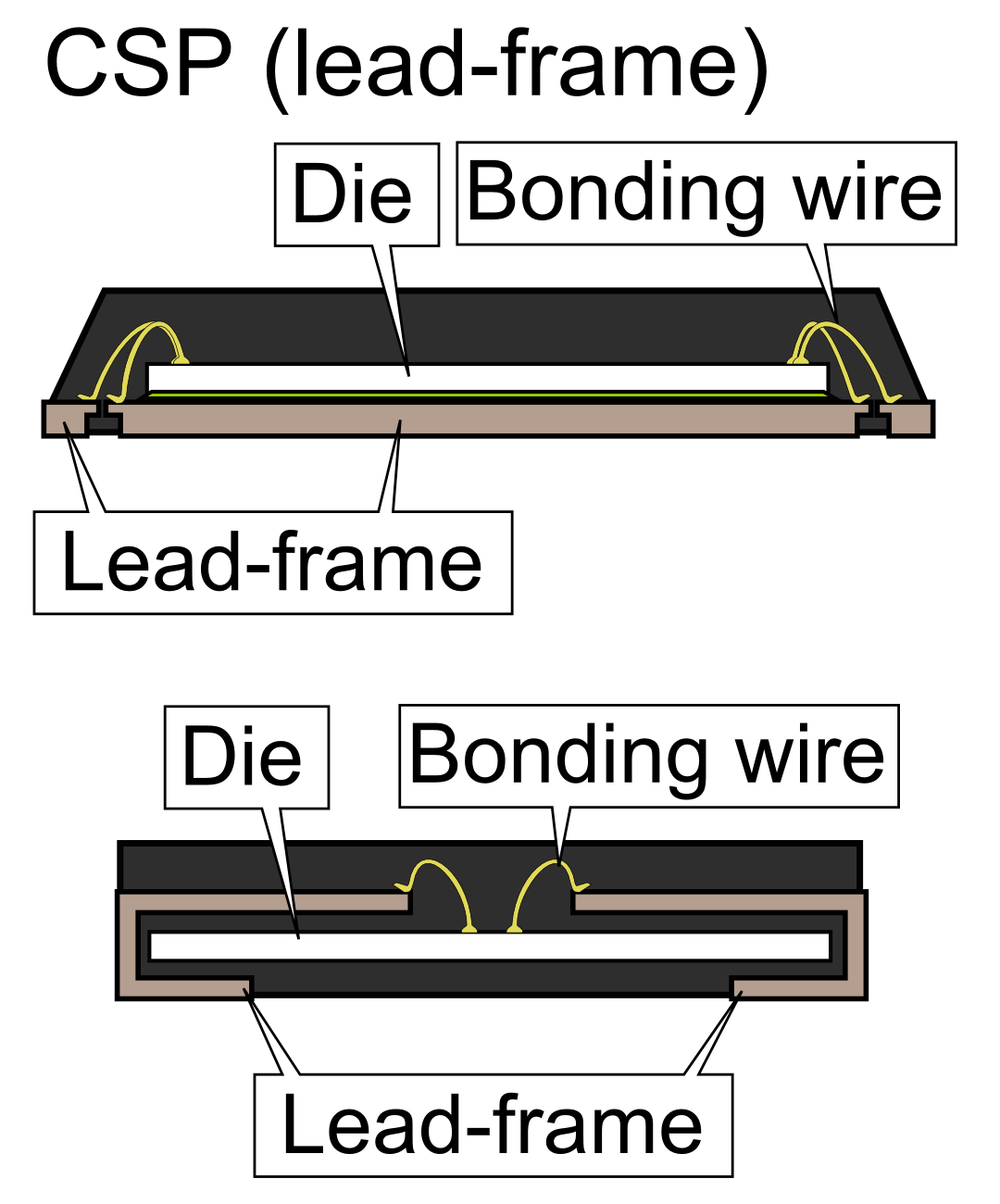
Lead frame of a surface-mount technology package

Most kinds of integrated circuit packaging are made by placing a silicon chip on a lead frame, wire bonding the chip to the metal leads of the lead frame, and covering the chip with plastic. The metal leads protruding from the plastic are then either "cut long" and bent to form through-hole pins, or "cut short" and bent to form surface-mount leads. Such lead frames are used for surface mount packages with leads – such as Small Outline Integrated Circuit Quad Flat Package – and for through-hole packages such as dual in-line package – and even for so-called "leadless" or "no‑lead" packages – such as Quad Flat No‑leads package.

The lead frame (and therefore the pins, if any, formed from that lead frame) are occasionally made from Invar or similar alloys, due to their low coefficient of thermal expansion.

== In consumer electronics ==
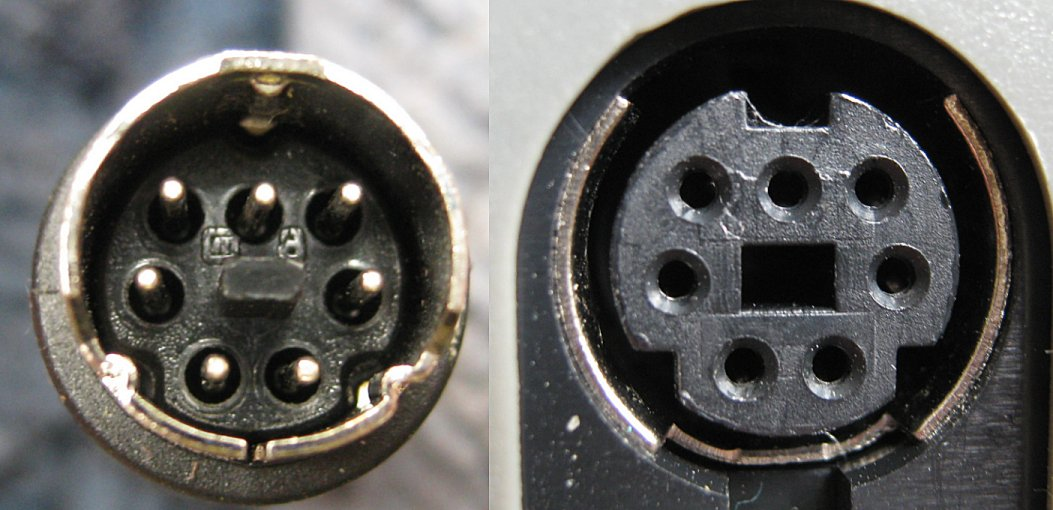
A mini-DIN connector pair. Left: male end, with 7 plug pins. Right: female end, with 7 socket pins.

The male ends of many electrical connectors are composed of multiple pins that fit into the corresponding female connectors' sockets.

== Electrical effects ==
For many circuit designs it can be assumed that the leads do not contribute to the electrical effects of individual components. However, this assumption begins to break down at higher frequencies and at very small scales. These effects come from the physical construction of the leads. The leads are often metal connections that run from the rest of the circuit to the materials that each component is made of. This design results in a very small capacitance between the ends of the leads where they connect to the device and very small inductances and resistances along each lead. Because the impedance of each component is a function of the frequency of the signals being passed through the device and the inductance and capacitance of the device, the leads can cause substantial variation in the properties of components in radio frequency circuits.
