= Eltek =

Norwegian electronics company

Delta Electronics (Norway) AS
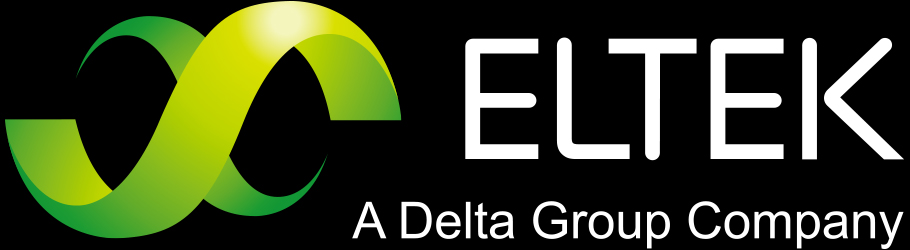
- Formerly: Eltek AS
- Type: Aksjeselskap
- Industry: Electronics
- Founded: 1971
- Founder: Alain Fernand Angelil
- Headquarters: Drammen, Norway
- Area served: Global
- Key people: Kelvin Huang(Chairman)
- Products: Energy systems Transmission systems
- Brands: Eltek
- Revenue: NOK 3,808 million (2014)
- Owner: Delta Electronics
- Number of employees: 2,378 (2014)
- Website: https://www.eltek.com/

Eltek is a brand of electric power conversion products for telecommunications and industrial applications, marketed as part of Delta Electronics. The products are developed and sold by Delta Electronics (Norway) AS, which is based in Drammen, Norway. As of 2018, Eltek had approximately 2000 employees, with offices in 40 countries.

== History ==
Eltek was a Norwegian-based company that specialized in designing, manufacturing, and distributing power supplies for various industrial and commercial applications. Founded in 1971, the company initially focused on manufacturing electronic equipment for the military, but later expanded its product line to include power supplies for various applications. In the 1990s, Eltek shifted its focus to the rapidly growing telecommunications industry and found great success. Today, Eltek-branded products are available in over 100 countries, serving customers across industries such as telecom, data centers, power utilities, and transportation.

In 1998, the company was listed on the Oslo Stock Exchange. under the name Eltek ASA. In 2007 the company bought the Texas-based company Valere Power, and changed its name to Eltek Valere AS. In 2011, the company changed its name again to Eltek AS.

In 2015, Eltek ASA was acquired by Delta Electronics, and delisted from the Oslo Stock Exchange. In 2023, the company name changed to Delta Electronics (Norway) AS, with Eltek continuing as a brand within the Delta Electronics organization. Delta Electronics Norway (AS) continues to operate from Drammen, where Eltek was founded and had its headquarters.
