= Phenolic =

Phenolic may refer to:

- related to phenols, a class of chemical compounds
  - Phenol, or carbolic acid, the simplest of the phenols
  - Naturally occurring phenols
  - Polyphenol

== See also ==
- Phenolic content in wine
  - Phenolic taint, a wine fault
- Phenol formaldehyde resin, or phenolic resins
  - Micarta, a brand name for composites of various fibers integrated in a thermosetting plastic
- Phenolic paper, paper composite material used to make printed circuit board substrates
