= 4-tert-Butylphenol =

Organic aromatic compound

Names
- IUPAC name 4-tert-Butylphenol
- Other names p-tert-Butylphenol; Butylphen, Para tertiary butylphenol

Identifiers
CAS Number	98-54-4
3D model (JSmol)	Interactive image
ChEBI	CHEBI:34444
ChEMBL	ChEMBL16217
ChemSpider	13846663
ECHA InfoCard	100.002.436
EC Number	202-679-0
KEGG	C14200
PubChem CID	7393
UNII	O81VMW36CV
CompTox Dashboard (EPA)	DTXSID1020221
- InChI: InChI=1S/C10H14O/c1-10(2,3)8-4-6-9(11)7-5-8/h4-7,11H,1-3H3 Key: QHPQWRBYOIRBIT-UHFFFAOYSA-N
- SMILES: CC(C)(C)C1=CC=C(C=C1)O

Properties
Chemical formula	C_{10}H_{14}O
Molar mass	150.221 g·mol^{−1}
Appearance	white solid
Density	0.908 g/cm^{3} (20 °C)
Melting point	99.5 °C (211.1 °F; 372.6 K)
Boiling point	239.8 °C (463.6 °F; 513.0 K)
Solubility in water	0.6 g/L (20 °C)
- Except where otherwise noted, data are given for materials in their standard state (at 25 °C [77 °F], 100 kPa). Infobox references

4-tert-Butylphenol is an organic compound with the formula (CH_{3})_{3}CC_{6}H_{4}OH. It is one of three isomeric tert-butyl phenols. It is a white solid with a distinct phenolic odor. It dissolves in basic water.

== Manufacture ==
It can be prepared by acid-catalyzed alkylation of phenol with isobutene, 2-tert-butylphenol being the major side product. It can be produced by diverse transalkylation reactions.

== Uses ==
Its major uses are in the production of epoxy resins and curing agents and also in polycarbonate resins. It has also found use in the production of phenolic resins. Another use is in the production of para tertiary butylphenol formaldehyde resin. It has also found use as a plasticizer.

Bisphenol A is difunctional and used to produce epoxy resin and polycarbonate. 4-tert-Butylphenol is monofunctional and so in polymer science terms, bisphenol A is a polymer chain extender but 4-tert-butylphenol is a chain stopper or sometimes called endcapper. It is thus use to control molecular weight by limiting chain growth.

4-tert-Butylphenol has an OH group and so it may be reacted with epichlorohydrin and sodium hydroxide to produce the glycidyl ether which is used in epoxy resin chemistry. This molecule has the CAS Registry number of 3101-60-8.

Known uses of 4-tert-Butylphenol include in synthesis of Etofenprox, Halfenprox, Ono-3144 & Batebulast.

== Laboratory reactions ==
Hydrogenation gives trans-4-tert-butylcyclohexanol.

Controlled condensation with formaldehyde gives calixarenes.

== Safety ==
OSHA records show it as an irritant and has developed suggested test methods for its detection. A European Union risk assessment report into the molecule dated May 2006 suggested it had potential depigmenting properties and was a potential endocrine disruptor. This was done under its EINECS number of 202-679-0. Other papers have been published showing similar findings.
