= Spline roller =

A screen roller or spline roller is a small hand tool used to press screen mesh into the edges of a window frame that is fluted on the inner edges, or to press in the retainer spline that holds that mesh in place. Often these are combined into a single tool or combined with a spline cutter; versions are currently manufactured from plastic or wood and metal.

== Appearance and history ==
While a spline roller (also referred to as a "spline tool") is said to look like a less-sharp version of a pizza cutter (which it does), its origins are in fact from something different. Somewhere around or before 1920 a man named Julius Alexander Muhlberg who was co-owner of Winchester and Muhlberg, a New Jersey–based company. An innovator at heart, Julius had taken some other tool's handle, drilled a hole through a silver dollar, and after putting them both together with a nut and bolt, found it to be much faster to squish screening into the sides of a frame rather than the regular method of the time, nailing the screen into the frames. The original tool remained in the possession of his son, Julius Muhlberg, but unfortunately it seems to be hopelessly lost to time.
