= Composite epoxy material =

Composite epoxy materials (CEM) are a group of composite materials typically made from woven glass fabric surfaces and non-woven glass core combined with epoxy synthetic resin. They are typically used in printed circuit boards.

There are different types of CEMs:

- CEM-1 is low-cost, flame-retardant, cellulose-paper-based laminate with only one layer of woven glass fabric.
- CEM-2 has cellulose paper core and woven glass fabric surface.
- CEM-3 is very similar to the most commonly used PCB material, FR-4. Its color is white, and it is flame-retardant.
- CEM-4 quite similar to CEM-3 but not flame-retardant.
- CEM-5 (also called CRM-5) has polyester woven glass core.

== See also ==
- Micarta – Brand name for a fabric-plastic composite
- Fibre-reinforced plastic – Composite material made of a polymer matrix reinforced with fibres
