= Glass cloth =

Textile made from the amorphous solid

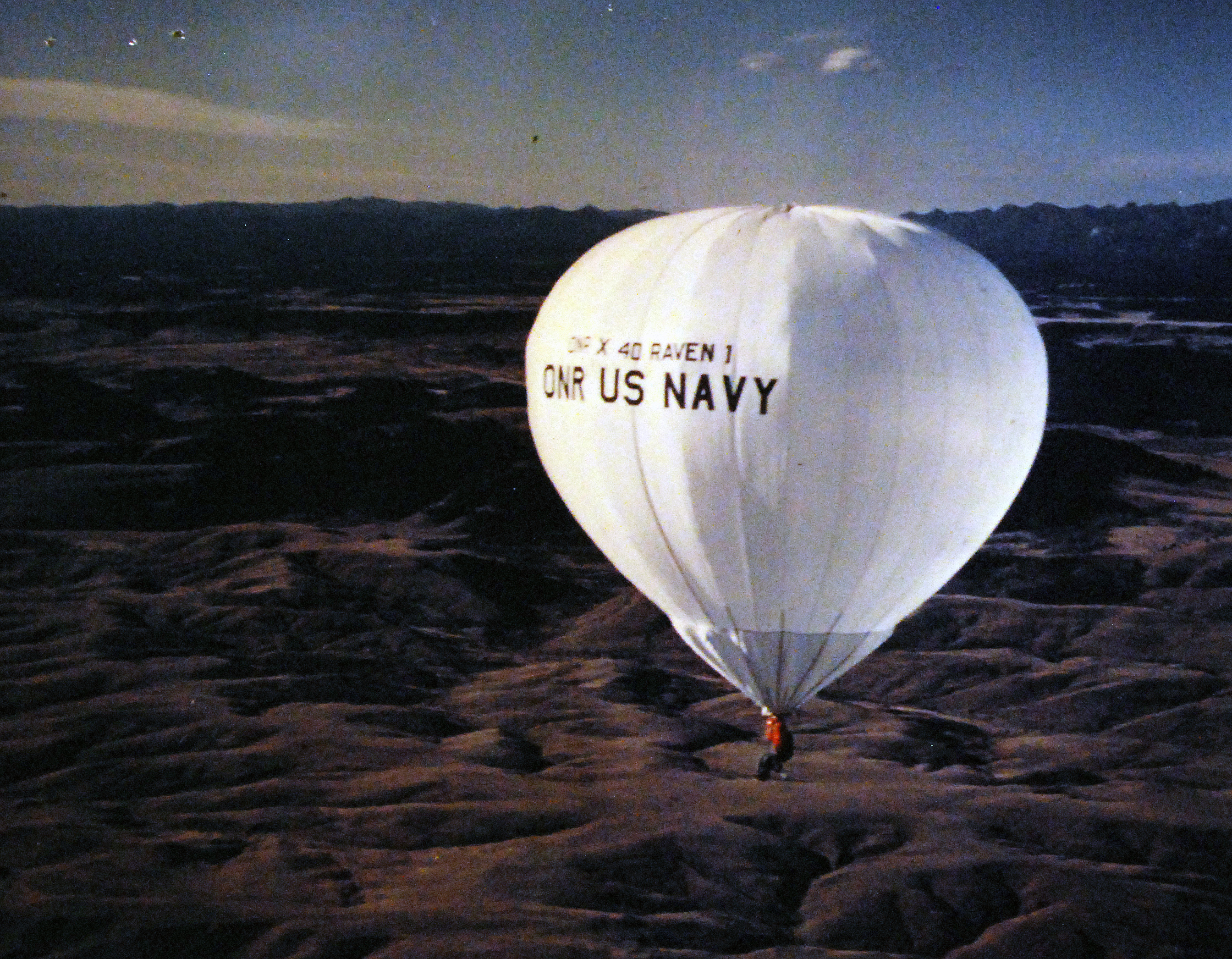
The lower portion of this hot air balloon is protected from heat by glass cloth.

Glass cloth is a textile material woven from glass fiber yarn.

== Home and garden ==
Glass cloth was originally developed to be used in greenhouse paneling, allowing sunlight's ultraviolet rays to be filtered out, while still allowing visible light through to plants.

Glass cloth is also a term for a type of tea towel suited for polishing glass. The cloth is usually woven with the plain weave, and may be patterned in various ways, though checked cloths are the most common. The original cloth was made from linen, but a large quantity is made with cotton warp and tow weft, and in some cases they are composed entirely of cotton. Short fibres of the cheaper kind are easily detached from the cloth.

In the Southern Plains during the Dust Bowl, states' health officials recommended attaching translucent glass cloth to the inside frames of windows to help in keeping the dust out of buildings, although people also used paperboard, canvas or blankets. Eyewitness accounts indicate they were not completely successful.

== Use in technology ==
Given the properties of glass—in particular, its heat resistance and inability to ignite—glass is often used to create fire barriers in hazardous environments, such as those inside racecars.

Due to its poor flexibility and ability to cause skin irritation, glass fibers are typically inadequate for use in apparel. However, the bi-directional strength of glass cloth has found utility in some fiberglass reinforced plastics. The Rutan VariEze homebuilt aircraft uses a moldless glass-cloth/epoxy composite, which acts as a protective skin.

Glass cloth is also commonly used as a reinforcing lattice for pre-pregs.

== See also ==
- G-10 (material)
