= G-10 (material) =

High-pressure fiberglass laminate

G-10 or garolite is a high-pressure fiberglass laminate, a type of composite material. It is created by stacking multiple layers of glass cloth, soaked in epoxy resin, then compressing the resulting material under heat until the epoxy cures. It is manufactured in flat sheets, most often a few millimeters thick.

G-10 is very similar to Micarta and carbon fiber laminates, except that glass cloth is used as filler material. (Note that the professional nomenclature of "filler" and "matrix" in composite materials may be somewhat counterintuitive when applied to soaking textiles with resin.)

G-10 is the toughest of the glass fiber resin laminates and therefore the most commonly used.

== Properties ==
G-10 is favored for its high strength, low moisture absorption, and high level of electrical insulation and chemical resistance. These properties are maintained not only at room temperature but also under humid or moist conditions. It was first used as a substrate for printed circuit boards, and its designation, G-10, comes from a National Electrical Manufacturers Association standard for this purpose.

== Decorative uses ==
Decorative variations of G-10 are produced in many colors and patterns and are especially used to make handles for knives, grips for firearms and other tools. These can be textured (for grip), bead blasted, sanded or polished. Its strength and low density make it useful for other kinds of handcrafting as well.

== Structural uses ==
G-10 is used to reinforce the edges of fiberglass coated wood. It is used to protect the point-of-contact on many such items. During ordinary use it is the G-10 that takes the brunt of the blow. In such applications it is meant to be replaced as it wears. G-10 is also used as a 3D-Printer build surface.

G-10 is also commonly used as a material for durable knife and gun handles and grips.

== Hazards ==
G-10 is safe to handle absent extreme conditions.

Hazards can result from cutting or grinding the material, as glass and epoxy dust are well known to contribute to respiratory disorders and may increase the risk of developing lung cancer. For any work of this kind, the work space should be appropriately ventilated and masks or respirators worn.

Epoxy resin is flammable and, once ignited, will burn vigorously, giving off poisonous gases. For this reason, materials such as FR-4 containing flame retardant additives have replaced G-10 in certain applications.

== See also ==
- Paper composite panels - comparable composite material made from paper filler and phenolic resin matrix, sold under the trade name Richlite
- Bakelite
