= Paper composite panels =

Paper composite panels are a phenolic resin/cellulose composite material made from paper or fabric and phenolic resin. As in phenolic paper multiple layers of paper are soaked in phenolic resin, then molded and baked into net shape in a heated form or press. Originally distributed as a commercial kitchen surface in the 1950s, it has recently been adapted for use in skateboard parks as well as various other applications, such as residential counters, cabinetry, fiberglass cores, guitar fingerboards, signage, exterior wall cladding, and a variety of architectural applications.

== Composition ==
There are several manufacturers in North America who use a different composition of materials to form the final product. One composition is cellulose fiber and phenolic resin (a type of polymer) which is combined and baked for a smooth hard surface. The natural fibers are made from plant, animal and mineral sources. However most natural fibers are predominantly cellulosic.

Molecular structure of a cellulose strand
1. Cellulose derived from tree pulp is turned into large rolls of paper.
2. The paper is then soaked in phenolic resin and goes up to a heating chamber to be dried out before being rolled back up.
3. Then hundreds of these sheets are laid on top of each other and with the use of compression molding the stack is compacted.

Because of the resin's thermoset properties the resulting cooled material is hard.

== Applications ==
It was used for the Boeing 747 for their air tables, hydroforming dyes, vacuum chuck faces, work holders, and proofing materials. Architecturally, it is used for countertops. It has also been used for whaleboard in fiberglass boat building. Other commercial uses include cutting boards, prep tables, pizza peels, and the dashboard of a pickup truck prototype vehicle.

Since the last quarter of the 20th century, phenolic resin and cellulose based compound materials have been used as an alternative to ebony and rosewood to make stringed instrument fingerboards. From 2012 to 2018 guitarmaker Gibson used Richlite, a paper composite material, for the fingerboard on several top-of-the-line production guitars.

== Properties ==
Even if it is formed by laminating many layers of paper together, the finished material appears as a solid, and is not considered to be a sandwich panel. Resistance to high temperatures has been claimed to be up to 350 °F.

== See also ==
- Micarta, a group of similar materials, especially if made with paper and epoxy resin.
- Ebonol, a paper and phenolic resin compound sometimes used for fingerboards in stringed instruments.
