= Printed circuit board =

Board to support and connect electronic components

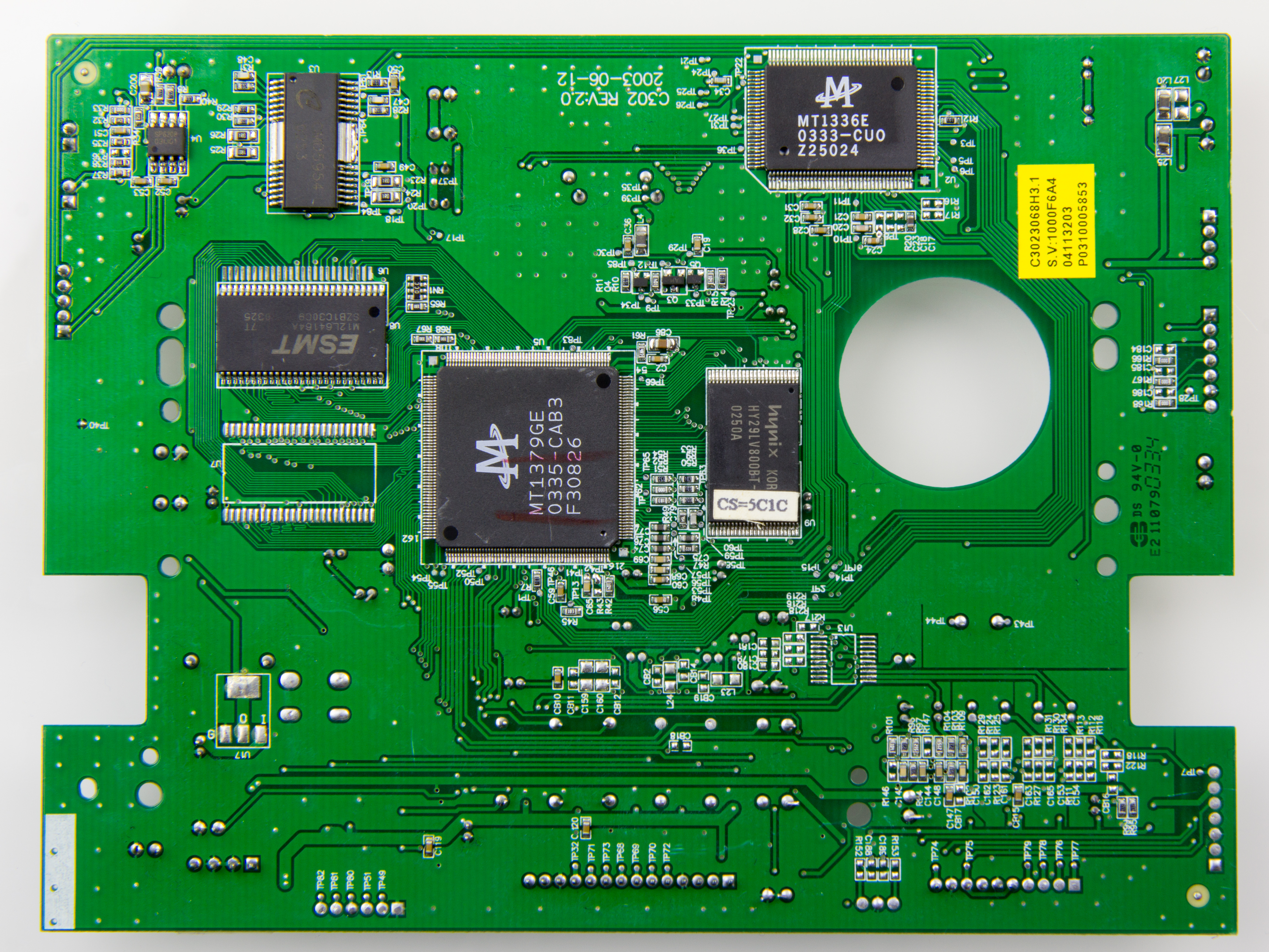
Printed circuit board of a DVD player

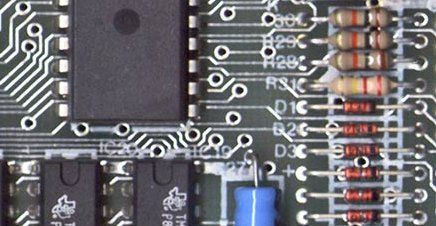
Part of a 1984 Sinclair ZX Spectrum computer board, a printed circuit board, showing the conductive traces, the through-hole paths to the other surface, vias connecting traces on both sides, and some electronic components mounted using through-hole mounting

A printed circuit board (PCB), also known as a printed wiring board (PWB), is a laminated sandwich structure of conductive and insulating layers, each with a pattern of traces, planes and other features (similar to wires on a flat surface) etched from one or more sheet layers of copper laminated onto or between sheet layers of a non-conductive substrate. PCBs are used to connect or "wire" components to one another in an electronic circuit. Electrical components may be fixed to conductive pads on the outer layers, generally by soldering, which both electrically connects and mechanically fastens the components to the board. Another manufacturing process adds vias, metal-lined drilled holes that enable electrical interconnections between conductive layers, to boards with more than a single side.

Printed circuit boards are used in nearly all electronic products today. Alternatives to PCBs include wire wrap and point-to-point construction, both once popular but now rarely used. PCBs require additional design effort to lay out the circuit, but manufacturing and assembly can be automated. Electronic design automation software is available to do much of the work of layout. Mass-producing circuits with PCBs is cheaper and faster than with other wiring methods, as components are mounted and wired in one operation. Large numbers of PCBs can be fabricated at the same time, and the layout has to be done only once. PCBs can also be made manually in small quantities, with reduced benefits.

PCBs can be single-sided (one copper layer), double-sided (two copper layers on both sides of one substrate layer), or multi-layer (stacked layers of substrate with copper plating sandwiched between each and on the outside layers). Multi-layer PCBs provide much higher component density, because circuit traces on the inner layers would otherwise take up surface space between components. The rise in popularity of multilayer PCBs with more than two, and especially with more than four, copper planes was concurrent with the adoption of surface-mount technology. However, multilayer PCBs make repair, analysis, and field modification of circuits much more difficult and usually impractical.

The world market for bare PCBs exceeded US$60.2 billion in 2014, and was estimated at $80.33 billion in 2024, forecast to be $96.57 billion for 2029, growing at 4.87% per annum.

== History ==
=== Predecessors ===
Before the development of printed circuit boards, electrical and electronic circuits were wired point-to-point on a chassis. Typically, the chassis was a sheet metal frame or pan, sometimes with a wooden bottom. Components were attached to the chassis, usually by insulators when the connecting point on the chassis was metal, and then their leads were connected directly or with jumper wires by soldering, or sometimes using crimp connectors, wire connector lugs on screw terminals, or other methods. Circuits were large, bulky, heavy, and relatively fragile (even discounting the breakable glass envelopes of the vacuum tubes that were often included in the circuits), and production was labor-intensive, so the products were expensive.

Development of the methods used in modern printed circuit boards started early in the 20th century. In 1903, a German inventor, Albert Hanson, described flat foil conductors laminated to an insulating board, in multiple layers. Thomas Edison experimented with chemical methods of plating conductors onto linen paper in 1904. Arthur Berry in 1913 patented a print-and-etch method in the UK, and in the United States Max Schoop obtained a patent to flame-spray metal onto a board through a patterned mask. Charles Ducas in 1925 patented a method of electroplating circuit patterns.

Predating the printed circuit invention, and similar in spirit, was John Sargrove's 1936–1947 Electronic Circuit Making Equipment (ECME) that sprayed metal onto a Bakelite plastic board. The ECME could produce three radio boards per minute.

=== Early PCBs ===
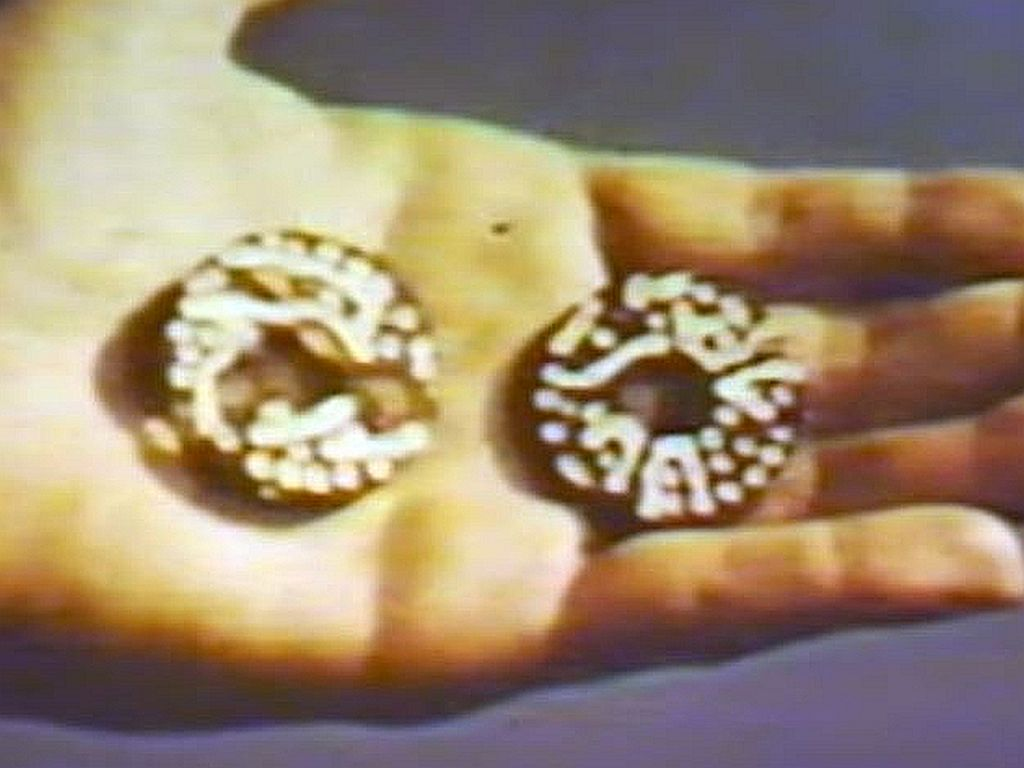
Proximity fuze Mark 53 production line 1944

The Austrian engineer Paul Eisler invented the printed circuit as part of a radio set while working in the UK around 1936. In 1941 a multi-layer printed circuit was used in German magnetic influence naval mines.

Around 1943 the United States began to use the technology on a large scale to make proximity fuzes for use in World War II. Such fuzes required an electronic circuit that could withstand being fired from a gun, and could be produced in quantity. The Centralab Division of Globe Union submitted a proposal using thick-film technology which met the requirements. A ceramic plate would be screenprinted with metallic paint for conductors and carbon material for resistors, with ceramic disc capacitors and subminiature vacuum tubes soldered in place. The technique proved viable, and the resulting patent on the process, which was classified by the U.S. Army, was assigned to Globe Union. It was not until 1984 that the Institute of Electrical and Electronics Engineers (IEEE) awarded Harry W. Rubinstein its Cledo Brunetti Award for early key contributions to the development of printed components and conductors on a common insulating substrate. Rubinstein was honored in 1984 by his alma mater, the University of Wisconsin-Madison, for his innovations in the technology of printed electronic circuits and the fabrication of capacitors. This invention also represents a step in the development of integrated circuit technology, as not only wiring but also passive components were fabricated on the ceramic substrate.

=== Post-war developments ===
In 1948, the US released the invention for commercial use. Printed circuits did not become commonplace in consumer electronics until the mid-1950s, after the Auto-Sembly process was developed by the United States Army. At around the same time in the UK work along similar lines was carried out by Geoffrey Dummer, then at the RRDE.

Motorola was an early leader in bringing the process into consumer electronics, announcing in August 1952 the adoption of "plated circuits" in home radios after six years of research and a $1M investment. Motorola soon began using its trademarked term for the process, PLAcir, in its consumer radio advertisements. Hallicrafters released its first "foto-etch" printed circuit product, a clock-radio, on November 1, 1952.

Even as circuit boards became available, the point-to-point chassis construction method remained in common use in industry (such as TV and hi-fi sets) into at least the late 1960s. Printed circuit boards were introduced to reduce the size, weight, and cost of parts of the circuitry. In 1960, a small consumer radio receiver might be built with all its circuitry on one circuit board, but a TV set would probably contain one or more circuit boards.

Originally, every electronic component had wire leads, and a PCB had holes drilled for each wire of each component. The component leads were then inserted through the holes and soldered to the copper PCB traces. This method of assembly is called through-hole construction. In 1949, Moe Abramson and Stanislaus F. Danko of the United States Army Signal Corps developed the Auto-Sembly process in which component leads were inserted into a copper foil interconnection pattern and dip soldered. The patent they obtained in 1956 was assigned to the U.S. Army. With the development of board lamination and etching techniques, this concept evolved into the standard printed circuit board fabrication process in use today. Soldering could be done automatically by passing the board over a ripple, or wave, of molten solder in a wave-soldering machine. However, the wires and holes are inefficient since drilling holes is expensive and consumes drill bits and the protruding wires are cut off and discarded.

Since the 1980s, surface mount parts have increasingly replaced through-hole components, enabling smaller boards and lower production costs, but making repairs more challenging.

In the 1990s the use of multilayer surface boards became more frequent. As a result, size was further minimized and both flexible and rigid PCBs were incorporated in different devices. In 1995 PCB manufacturers began using microvia technology to produce High-Density Interconnect (HDI) PCBs.

=== Recent advances ===
3D printed electronics (PEs) can be utilized to print items layer by layer and subsequently the item can be printed with a liquid ink that contains electronic functionalities.

HDI (High Density Interconnect) technology allows for a denser design on the PCB and thus potentially smaller PCBs with more traces and components in a given area. As a result, the paths between components can be shorter. HDIs use blind/buried vias, or a combination that includes microvias. With multi-layer HDI PCBs the interconnection of several vias stacked on top of each other (stacked vías, instead of one deep buried via) can be made stronger, thus enhancing reliability in all conditions. The most common applications for HDI technology are computer and mobile phone components as well as medical equipment and military communication equipment. A 4-layer HDI microvia PCB is equivalent in quality to an 8-layer through-hole PCB, so HDI technology can reduce costs. HDI PCBs are often made using build-up film such as ajinomoto build-up film, which is also used in the production of flip chip packages. Some PCBs have optical waveguides, similar to optical fibers built on the PCB.

== Compositions ==
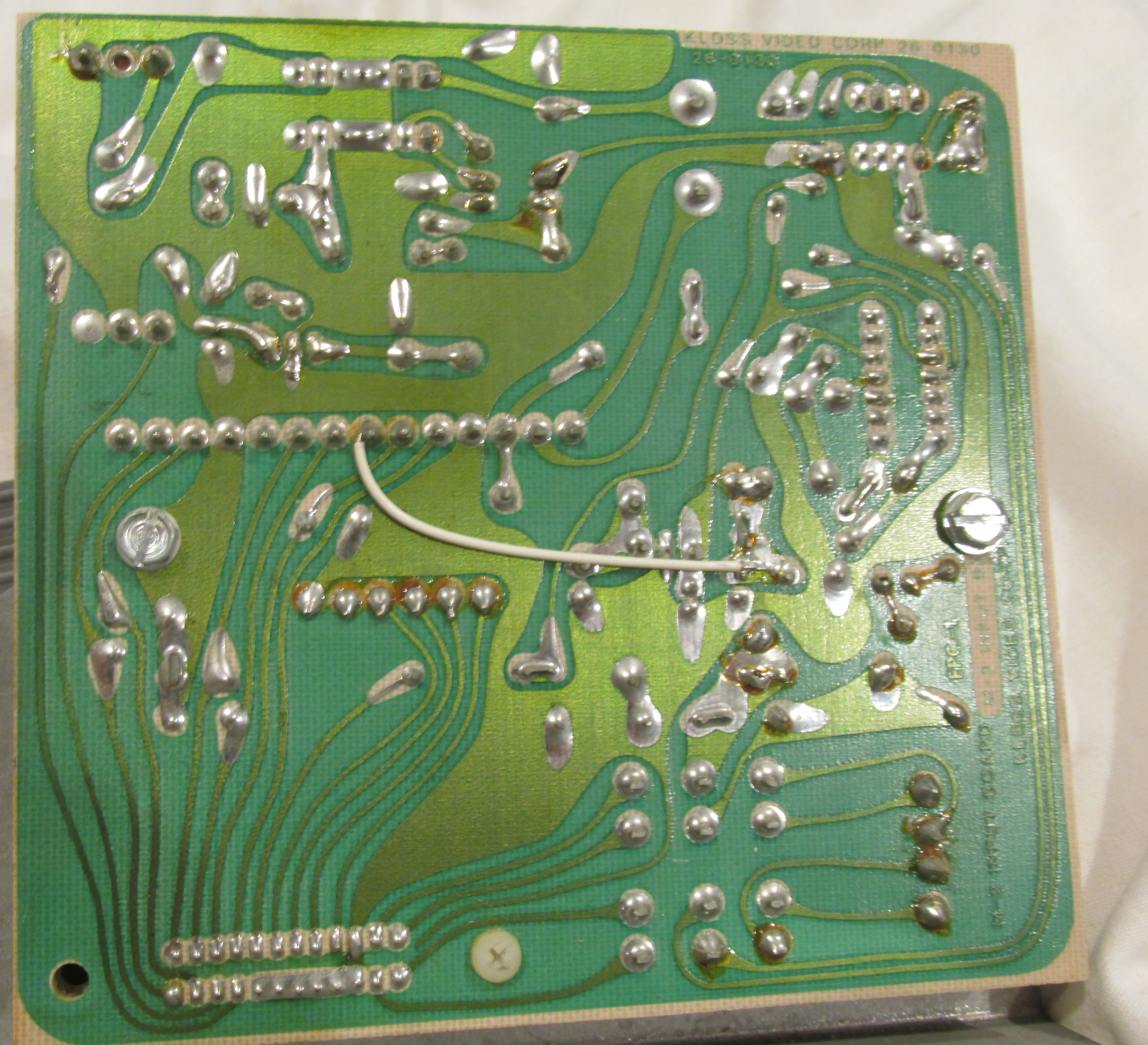
An example of hand-drawn etched traces on a PCB

A basic PCB consists of a flat sheet of insulating material and a layer of copper foil, laminated to the substrate. Chemical etching divides the copper into separate conducting lines called tracks or circuit traces, pads for connections, vias to pass connections between layers of copper, and features such as solid conductive areas for electromagnetic shielding or other purposes. The tracks function as wires fixed in place, and are insulated from each other by air and the board substrate material. The surface of a PCB may have a coating that protects the copper from corrosion and reduces the chances of solder shorts between traces or undesired electrical contact with stray bare wires. For its function in helping to prevent solder shorts, the coating is called solder resist or solder mask.

The pattern to be etched into each copper layer of a PCB is called the "artwork". The etching is usually done using photoresist which is coated onto the PCB, then exposed to light projected in the pattern of the artwork. The resist material protects the copper from dissolution into the etching solution. The etched board is then cleaned. A PCB design can be mass-reproduced in a way similar to the way photographs can be mass-duplicated from film negatives using a photographic printer.

FR-4 glass epoxy is the most common insulating substrate. Another substrate material is cotton paper impregnated with phenolic resin, often tan or brown.

A PCB may be printed with a legend identifying the components, test points, or identifying text. Originally, silkscreen printing was used for this purpose, but today other, finer quality printing methods are usually used. Normally the legend does not affect the function of a PCBA.

=== Layers ===
A printed circuit board can have multiple layers of copper which almost always are arranged in pairs. The number of layers and the interconnection designed between them (vias, PTHs) provide a general estimate of the board complexity. Using more layers allow for more routing options and better control of signal integrity, but are also time-consuming and costly to manufacture. Likewise, selection of the vias for the board also allow fine tuning of the board size, escaping of signals off complex ICs, routing, and long term reliability, but are tightly coupled with production complexity and cost.

One of the simplest boards to produce is the two-layer board. It has copper on both sides that are referred to as external layers; multi layer boards sandwich additional internal layers of copper and insulation. After two-layer PCBs, the next step up is the four-layer. The four layer board adds significantly more routing options in the internal layers as compared to the two layer board, and often some portion of the internal layers is used as ground plane or power plane, to achieve better signal integrity, higher signaling frequencies, lower EMI, and better power supply decoupling.

In multi-layer boards, the layers of material are laminated together in an alternating sandwich: copper, substrate, copper, substrate, copper, etc.; each plane of copper is etched, and any internal vias (that will not extend to both outer surfaces of the finished multilayer board) are plated-through, before the layers are laminated together. Only the outer layers need be coated; the inner copper layers are protected by the adjacent substrate layers.

=== Component mounting ===
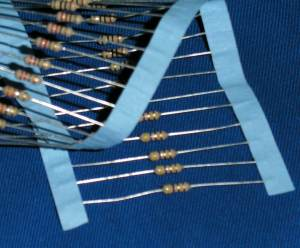
Through-hole (leaded) resistors on a paper tape. When mounted to a PCB, the resistors are removed from the tape and their leads are trimmed to required length.

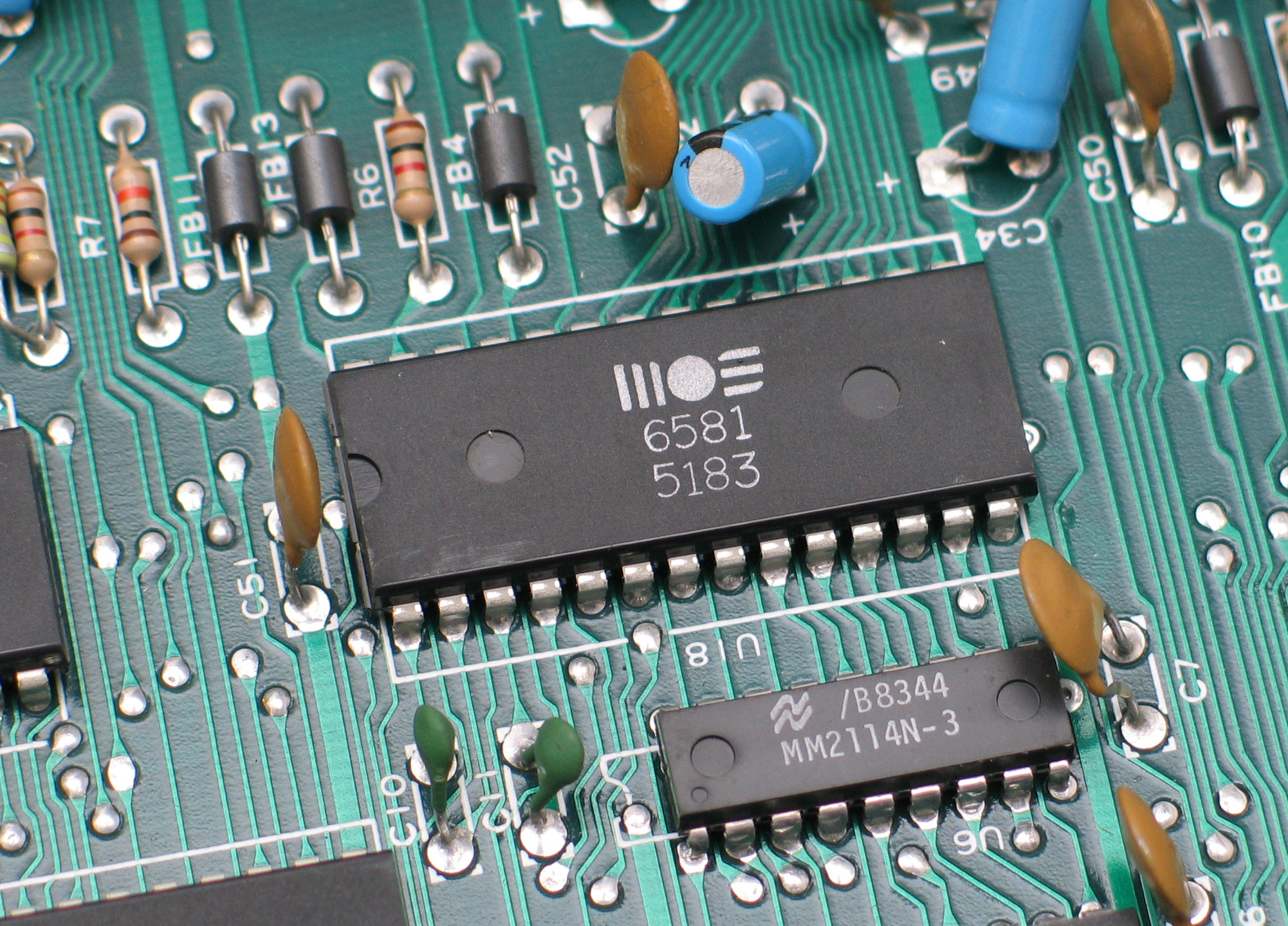
Through-hole devices mounted on the circuit board of a mid-1980s Commodore 64 home computer

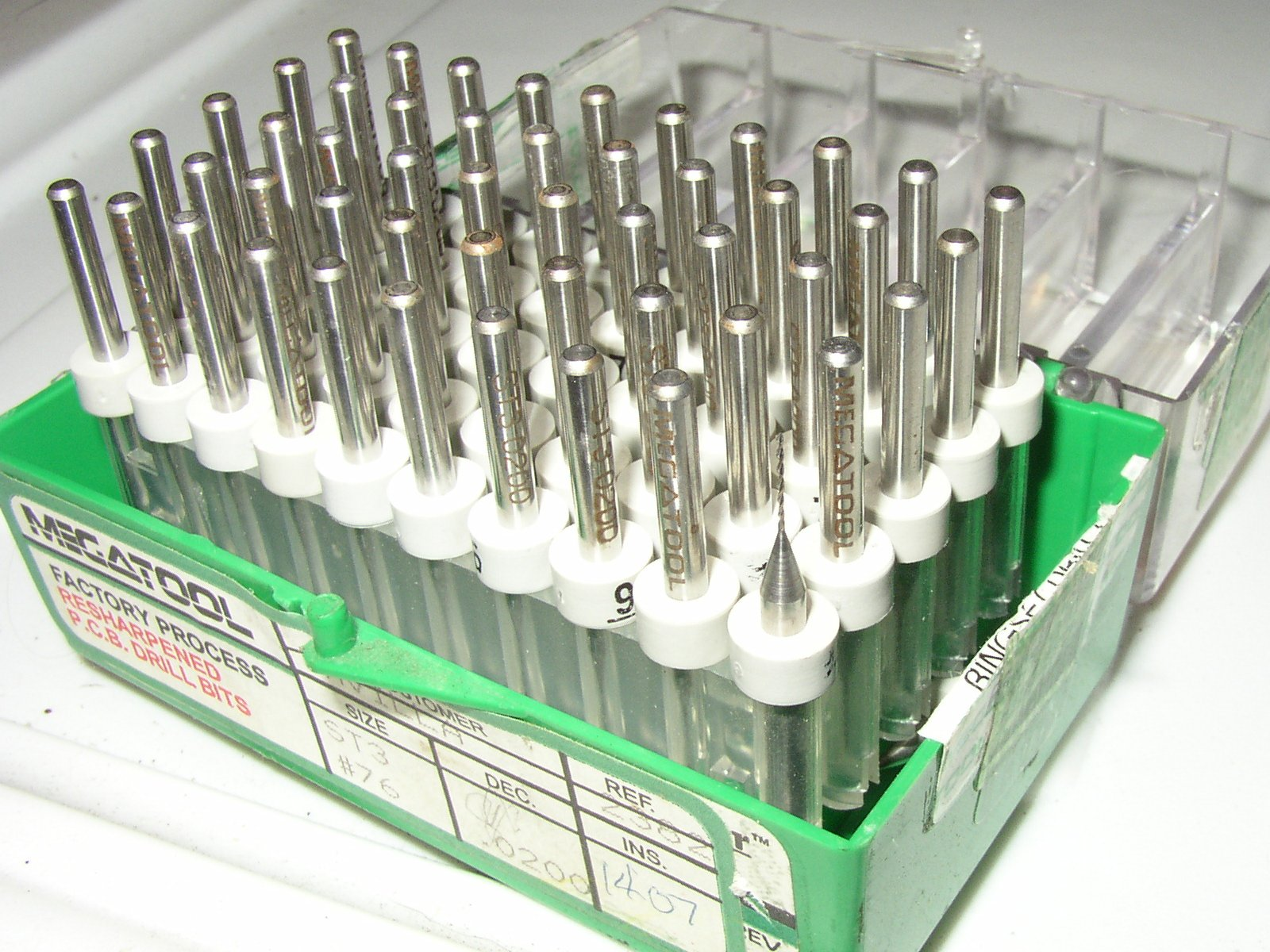
A box of drill bits used for making holes in printed circuit boards. While tungsten-carbide bits are very hard, they eventually wear out or break. Drilling is a considerable part of the cost of a through-hole printed circuit board.

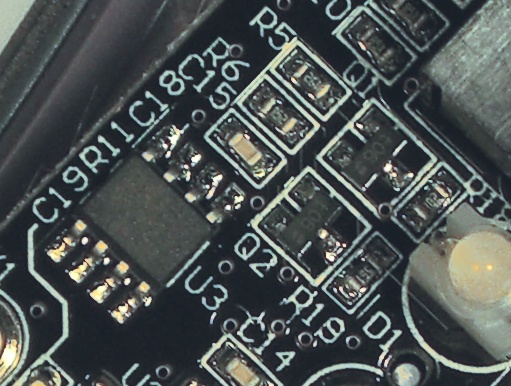
Surface mount components, including resistors, capacitors, transistors and an integrated circuit

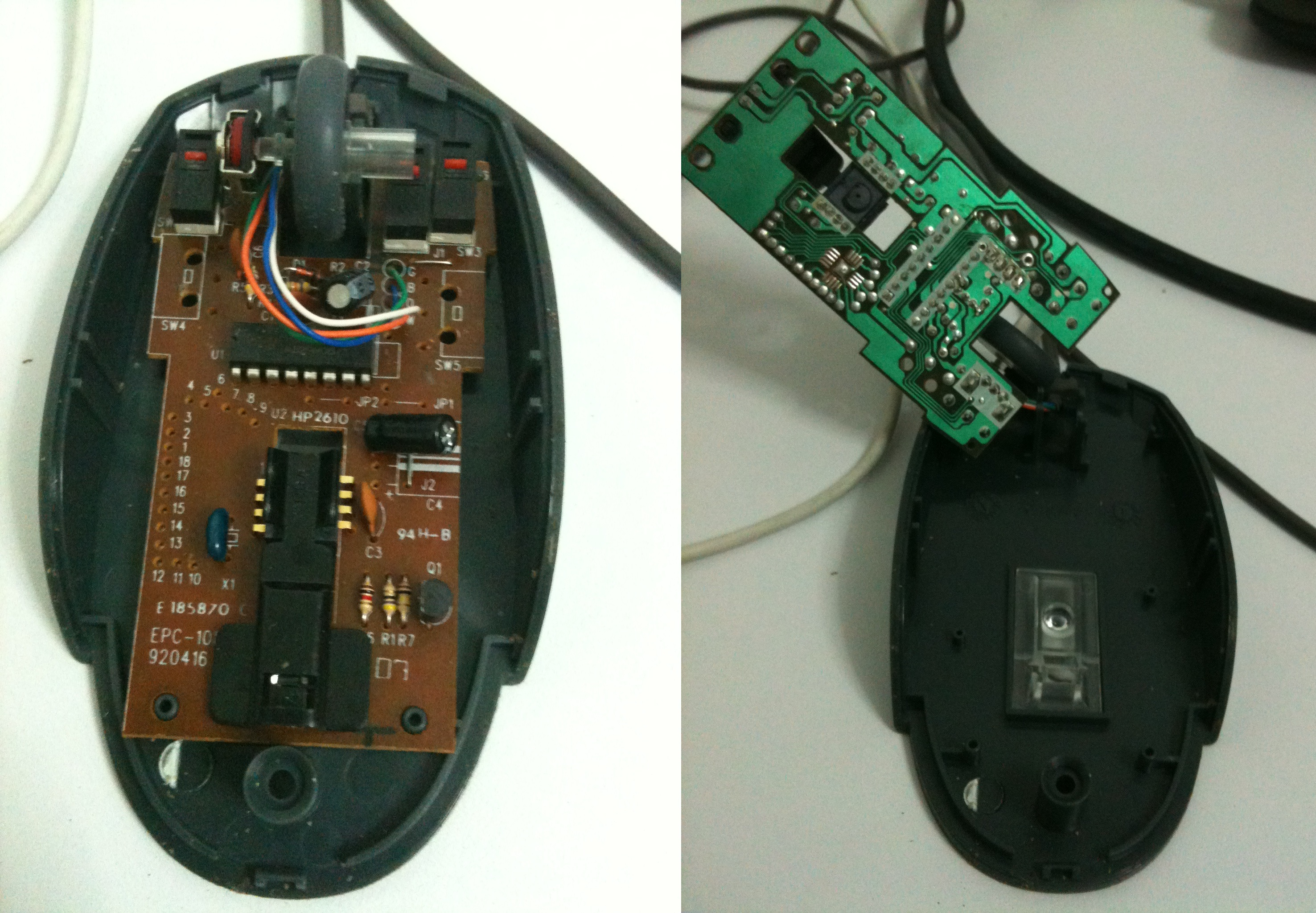
A single-sided PCB in a computer mouse: the component side (left) and the printed side (right)

"Through hole" components are mounted by their wire leads passing through the board and soldered to traces on the other side. "Surface mount" components are attached by their leads to copper traces on the same side of the board. A board may use both methods for mounting components. PCBs with only through-hole mounted components are now uncommon. Surface mounting is used for transistors, diodes, IC chips, resistors, and capacitors. Through-hole mounting may be used for some large components such as electrolytic capacitors and connectors.

The first PCBs used through-hole technology, mounting electronic components by inserting leads through holes on one side of the board and soldering onto copper traces on the other side. Boards may be single-sided, with an unplated component side, or more compact double-sided boards, with components soldered on both sides. Horizontal installation of through-hole parts with two axial leads (such as resistors, capacitors, and diodes) is done by bending the leads 90 degrees in the same direction, inserting the part in the board (often bending leads located on the back of the board in opposite directions to improve the part's mechanical strength), soldering the leads, and trimming off the ends. Leads may be soldered either manually or by a wave soldering machine.

Surface-mount technology emerged in the 1960s, gained momentum in the early 1980s, and became widely used by the mid-1990s. Components were mechanically redesigned to have small metal tabs or end caps that could be soldered directly onto the PCB surface, instead of wire leads to pass through holes. Components became much smaller and component placement on both sides of the board became more common than with through-hole mounting, allowing much smaller PCB assemblies with much higher circuit densities. Surface mounting lends itself well to a high degree of automation, reducing labor costs and greatly increasing production rates compared with through-hole circuit boards. Components can be supplied mounted on carrier tapes. Surface mount components can be about one-quarter to one-tenth of the size and weight of through-hole components, and passive components much cheaper. However, prices of semiconductor surface mount devices (SMDs) are determined more by the chip itself than the package, with little price advantage over larger packages, and some wire-ended components, such as 1N4148 small-signal switch diodes, are actually significantly cheaper than SMD equivalents.

=== Electrical properties ===
Each trace consists of a flat, narrow part of the copper foil that remains after etching. Its resistance, determined by its width, thickness, and length, must be sufficiently low for the current the conductor will carry. Power and ground traces may need to be wider than signal traces. In a multi-layer board one entire layer may be mostly solid copper to act as a ground plane for shielding and power return. For microwave circuits and high-speed digital signals (which use similar frequencies), transmission lines can be laid out in a planar form such as stripline or microstrip with carefully controlled dimensions to assure a consistent impedance. In radio-frequency and fast switching circuits the inductance and capacitance of the printed circuit board conductors become significant circuit elements, usually undesired; conversely, they can be used as a deliberate part of the circuit design, as in distributed-element filters, antennae, and fuses, obviating the need for additional discrete components. High density interconnects (HDI) PCBs have tracks or vias with a width or diameter of under 152 micrometers.

== Materials ==
=== Laminates ===
Laminates are manufactured by curing layers of cloth or paper with thermoset resin under pressure and heat to form an integral final piece of uniform thickness. They can be up to 4 by 8 feet (1.2 by 2.4 m) in width and length. Varying cloth weaves (threads per inch or cm), cloth thickness, and resin percentage are used to achieve the desired final thickness and dielectric characteristics. Available standard laminate thickness are listed in ANSI/IPC-D-275.

The cloth or fiber material used, resin material, and the cloth to resin ratio determine the laminate's type designation (FR-4, CEM-1, G-10, etc.) and therefore the characteristics of the laminate produced. Important characteristics are the level to which the laminate is fire retardant, the dielectric constant (e_{r}), the loss tangent (tan δ), the tensile strength, the shear strength, the glass transition temperature (T_{g}), and the Z-axis expansion coefficient (how much the thickness changes with temperature).

There are quite a few different dielectrics that can be chosen to provide different insulating values depending on the requirements of the circuit. Some of these dielectrics are polytetrafluoroethylene (Teflon), FR-4, FR-1, CEM-1 or CEM-3. Well known pre-preg materials used in the PCB industry are FR-2 (phenolic cotton paper), FR-3 (cotton paper and epoxy), FR-4 (woven glass and epoxy), FR-5 (woven glass and epoxy), FR-6 (matte glass and polyester), G-10 (woven glass and epoxy), CEM-1 (cotton paper and epoxy), CEM-2 (cotton paper and epoxy), CEM-3 (non-woven glass and epoxy), CEM-4 (woven glass and epoxy), CEM-5 (woven glass and polyester). Thermal expansion is an important consideration especially with ball grid array (BGA) and naked die technologies, and glass fiber offers the best dimensional stability.

FR-4 is by far the most common material used today. The board stock with unetched copper on it is called "copper-clad laminate".

With decreasing size of board features and increasing frequencies, small non-homogeneities like uneven distribution of fiberglass or other filler, thickness variations, and bubbles in the resin matrix, and the associated local variations in the dielectric constant, are gaining importance.

=== Key substrate parameters ===
The circuit-board substrates are usually dielectric composite materials. The composites contain a matrix (usually an epoxy resin) and a reinforcement (usually a woven, sometimes non-woven, glass fibers, sometimes even paper), and in some cases a filler is added to the resin (e.g. ceramics; titanate ceramics can be used to increase the dielectric constant).

The reinforcement type defines two major classes of materials: woven and non-woven. Woven reinforcements are cheaper, but the high dielectric constant of glass may not be favorable for many higher-frequency applications. The spatially non-homogeneous structure also introduces local variations in electrical parameters, due to different resin/glass ratio at different areas of the weave pattern. Non-woven reinforcements, or materials with low or no reinforcement, are more expensive but more suitable for some RF/analog applications.

The substrates are characterized by several key parameters, chiefly thermomechanical (glass transition temperature, tensile strength, shear strength, thermal expansion), electrical (dielectric constant, loss tangent, dielectric breakdown voltage, leakage current, tracking resistance...), and others (e.g. moisture absorption).

At the glass transition temperature the resin in the composite softens and significantly increases thermal expansion; exceeding T_{g} then exerts mechanical overload on the board components - e.g. the joints and the vias. Below T_{g} the thermal expansion of the resin roughly matches copper and glass, above it gets significantly higher. As the reinforcement and copper confine the board along the plane, virtually all volume expansion projects to the thickness and stresses the plated-through holes. Repeated soldering or other exposition to higher temperatures can cause failure of the plating, especially with thicker boards; thick boards therefore require a matrix with a high T_{g}.

The materials used determine the substrate's dielectric constant. This constant is also dependent on frequency, usually decreasing with frequency. As this constant determines the signal propagation speed, frequency dependence introduces phase distortion in wideband applications; as flat a dielectric constant vs frequency characteristics as is achievable is important here. The impedance of transmission lines decreases with frequency, therefore faster edges of signals reflect more than slower ones.

Dielectric breakdown voltage determines the maximum voltage gradient the material can be subjected to before suffering a breakdown (conduction, or arcing, through the dielectric).

Tracking resistance determines how the material resists high voltage electrical discharges creeping over the board surface.

Loss tangent determines how much of the electromagnetic energy from the signals in the conductors is absorbed in the board material. This factor is important for high frequencies. Low-loss materials are more expensive. Choosing unnecessarily low-loss material is a common engineering error in high-frequency digital design; it increases the cost of the boards without a corresponding benefit. Signal degradation by loss tangent and dielectric constant can be easily assessed by an eye pattern.

Moisture absorption occurs when the material is exposed to high humidity or water. Both the resin and the reinforcement may absorb water; water also may be soaked by capillary forces through voids in the materials and along the reinforcement. Epoxies of the FR-4 materials are not too susceptible, with absorption of only 0.15%. Teflon has very low absorption of 0.01%. Polyimides and cyanate esters, on the other side, suffer from high water absorption. Absorbed water can lead to significant degradation of key parameters; it impairs tracking resistance, breakdown voltage, and dielectric parameters. Relative dielectric constant of water is about 73, compared to about 4 for common circuit board materials. Absorbed moisture can also vaporize on heating, as during soldering, and cause cracking and delamination, the same effect responsible for "popcorning" damage on wet packaging of electronic parts. Careful baking of the substrates may be required to dry them prior to soldering.

=== Common substrates ===
Often encountered materials:

- FR-2, phenolic paper or phenolic cotton paper, paper impregnated with a phenol formaldehyde resin. Common in consumer electronics with single-sided boards. Electrical properties inferior to FR-4. Poor arc resistance. Generally rated to 105 °C.
- FR-4, a woven fiberglass cloth impregnated with an epoxy resin. Low water absorption (up to about 0.15%), good insulation properties, good arc resistance. Very common. Several grades with somewhat different properties are available. Typically rated to 130 °C.
- Aluminum, or metal core board or insulated metal substrate (IMS), clad with thermally conductive thin dielectric - used for parts requiring significant cooling - power switches, LEDs. Consists of usually single, sometimes double layer thin circuit board based on e.g. FR-4, laminated on aluminum sheet metal, commonly 0.8, 1, 1.5, 2 or 3 mm thick. The thicker laminates sometimes also come with thicker copper metalization.
- Flexible substrates - can be a standalone copper-clad foil or can be laminated to a thin stiffener, e.g. 50–130 μm.
  - Polyimide foil is common in small form-factor consumer electronics or for flexible interconnects. Resistant to high temperatures. Brand names include Kapton, UPILEX, and Pyralux.
  - Polyester (PET), which is cheaper but less heat-resistant. Can be fully transparent.
  - Composites dielectrics, e.g. Puralux TK with polyimide and fluoropolymer. Copper layer may delaminate during soldering.
  - Parylene (poly-para-xylylene) as CVD-based alternative to Polyimide, suited for higher level integration.
- Ceramic printed circuit boards (ceramic PCBs) are a class of PCB substrates that use ceramic materials such as alumina (Al₂O₃) or aluminum nitride (AlN) instead of organic laminates. They are characterized by high thermal conductivity, excellent electrical insulation, and strong resistance to high temperatures and harsh environments, making them suitable for high-power, high-frequency, and high-reliability applications.

Less-often encountered materials:

- FR-1, like FR-2, typically specified to 105 °C, some grades rated to 130 °C. Room-temperature punchable. Similar to cardboard. Poor moisture resistance. Low arc resistance.
- FR-3, cotton paper impregnated with epoxy. Typically rated to 105 °C.
- FR-5, woven fiberglass and epoxy, high strength at higher temperatures, typically specified to 170 °C.
- FR-6, matte glass and polyester
- G-10, woven glass and epoxy - high insulation resistance, low moisture absorption, very high bond strength. Typically rated to 130 °C.
- G-11, woven glass and epoxy - high resistance to solvents, high flexural strength retention at high temperatures. Typically rated to 170 °C.
- CEM-1, cotton paper and epoxy
- CEM-2, cotton paper and epoxy
- CEM-3, non-woven glass and epoxy
- CEM-4, woven glass and epoxy
- CEM-5, woven glass and polyester
- PTFE, ("Teflon") - expensive, low dielectric loss, for high frequency applications, very low moisture absorption (0.01%), mechanically soft. Difficult to laminate, rarely used in multilayer applications.
- PTFE, ceramic filled - expensive, low dielectric loss, for high frequency applications. Varying ceramics/PTFE ratio allows adjusting dielectric constant and thermal expansion.
- RF-35, fiberglass-reinforced ceramics-filled PTFE. Relatively less expensive, good mechanical properties, good high-frequency properties.
- Alumina, a ceramic. Hard, brittle, very expensive, very high performance, good thermal conductivity.
- Polyimide, a high-temperature polymer. Expensive, high-performance. Higher water absorption (0.4%). Can be used from cryogenic temperatures to over 260 °C.

=== Copper thickness ===
Copper thickness of PCBs can be specified directly or as the weight of copper per area (in ounce per square foot) which is easier to measure. One ounce per square foot is 34 μm (0.0013 in) thickness. Thicker copper layers are used for high current or to dissipate heat better and might require more complex manufacturing processes. On the common FR-4 substrates, 1 oz copper per ft^{2} (35 μm (0.0014 in)) is the most common thickness; 2 oz (70 μm (0.0028 in)) and 0.5 oz (17.5 μm (0.00069 in)) thickness is often an option. Less common are 12 μm (0.00047 in) and 105 μm (0.0041 in), 9 μm (0.00035 in) is sometimes available on some substrates. Flexible substrates typically have thinner metalization. Metal-core boards for high power devices commonly use thicker copper; 35 μm (0.0014 in) is usual but also 140 μm (0.0055 in) and 400 μm (0.016 in) can be encountered. In the US, copper foil thickness is specified in units of ounces per square foot (oz/ft^{2}), commonly referred to simply as ounce. Common thicknesses are 1/2 oz/ft^{2} (150 g/m^{2}), 1 oz/ft^{2} (300 g/m^{2}), 2 oz/ft^{2} (600 g/m^{2}), and 3 oz/ft^{2} (900 g/m^{2}). These work out to thicknesses of 17.05 μm (0.000671 in) (0.67 thou), 34.1 μm (0.00134 in) (1.34 thou), 68.2 μm (0.00269 in) (2.68 thou), and 102.3 μm (0.00403 in) (4.02 thou), respectively.

oz/ft^{2}	g/m^{2}	μm	thou
1/2 oz/ft^{2}	150 g/m^{2}	17.05 μm	0.67 thou
1 oz/ft^{2}	300 g/m^{2}	34.1 μm	1.34 thou
2 oz/ft^{2}	600 g/m^{2}	68.2 μm	2.68 thou
3 oz/ft^{2}	900 g/m^{2}	102.3 μm	4.02 thou

1/2 oz/ft^{2} foil is not widely used as a finished copper weight, but is used for outer layers when plating for through holes will increase the finished copper weight. Some PCB manufacturers refer to 1 oz/ft^{2} copper foil as having a thickness of 35 μm (0.0014 in) (may also be referred to as 35 μ, 35 micron, or 35 mic).

- 1/0 – denotes 1 oz/ft^{2} copper one side, with no copper on the other side.
- 1/1 – denotes 1 oz/ft^{2} copper on both sides.
- H/0 or H/H – denotes 0.5 oz/ft^{2} copper on one or both sides, respectively.
- 2/0 or 2/2 – denotes 2 oz/ft^{2} copper on one or both sides, respectively.

== Manufacturing ==
Printed circuit board manufacturing involves manufacturing bare printed circuit boards and then populating them with electronic components. In large-scale board manufacturing, multiple PCBs are grouped on a single panel for efficient processing. After assembly, they are separated (depaneled).

== Types ==
=== Breakout boards ===
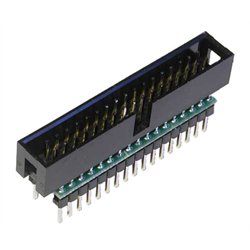
A breakout board can allow interconnection between two incompatible connectors.

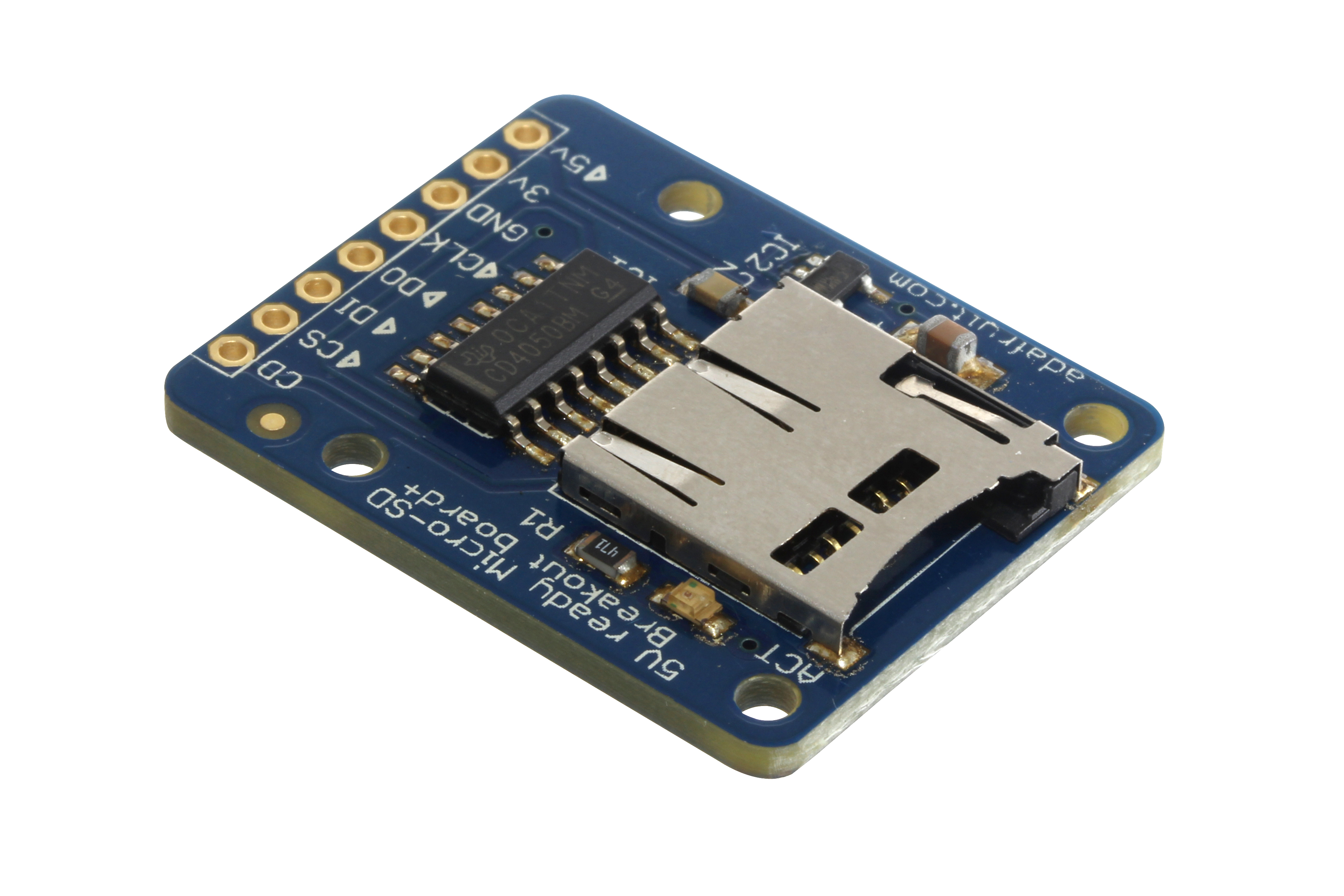
This breakout board allows an SD card's pins to be accessed easily while still allowing the card to be hot-swapped.

A minimal PCB for a single component, used for prototyping, is called a breakout board. The purpose of a breakout board is to "break out" the leads of a component on separate terminals so that manual connections to them can be made easily. Breakout boards are especially used for surface-mount components or any components with fine lead pitch.

Advanced PCBs may contain components embedded in the substrate, such as capacitors and integrated circuits, to reduce the amount of space taken up by components on the surface of the PCB while improving electrical characteristics.

=== Multiwire boards ===
Multiwire is a patented technique of interconnection which uses machine-routed insulated wires embedded in a non-conducting matrix (often plastic resin). It was used during the 1980s and 1990s. As of 2010, Multiwire is still available through Hitachi.

Since it was quite easy to stack interconnections (wires) inside the embedding matrix, the approach allowed designers to forget completely about the routing of wires (usually a time-consuming operation of PCB design): Anywhere the designer needs a connection, the machine will draw a wire in a straight line from one location/pin to another. This led to very short design times (no complex algorithms to use even for high density designs) as well as reduced crosstalk (which is worse when wires run parallel to each other—which almost never happens in Multiwire), though the cost is too high to compete with cheaper PCB technologies when large quantities are needed.

Corrections can be made to a Multiwire board layout more easily than to a PCB layout.

=== Cordwood construction ===
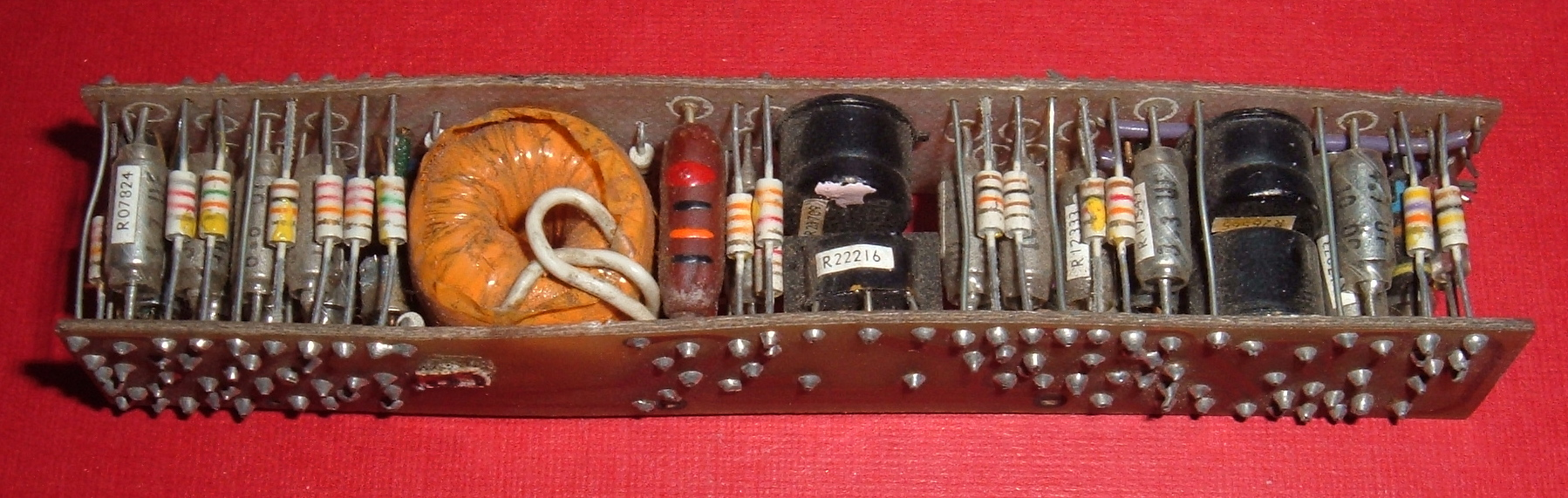
A cordwood module

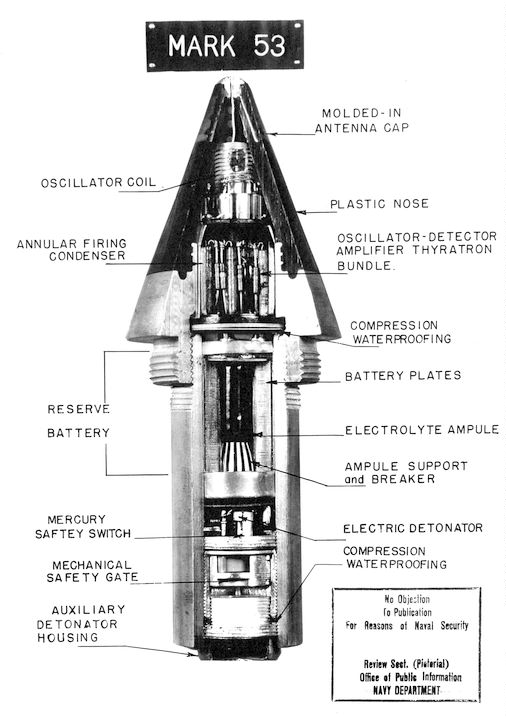
Cordwood construction was used in proximity fuzes.

Before the advent of integrated circuits, cordwood construction allowed the highest possible component packing density. The construction method was used with wire-ended components in applications where space was at a premium (such as fuzes, missile guidance, and telemetry systems) and in the high-speed computers of the day, where short traces were important. In cordwood construction, axial-leaded components were mounted between two parallel planes. The name comes from the way axial-lead components (capacitors, resistors, coils, and diodes) are stacked in parallel rows and columns, like a stack of firewood. The components were either soldered together with jumper wire or they were connected to other components by thin nickel ribbon welded at right angles onto the component leads.

Some versions of cordwood construction used soldered single-sided PCBs as the interconnection method (as pictured), allowing the use of normal-leaded components at the cost of being difficult to remove the boards or replace any component that is not at the edge.

Cordwood construction was replaced with multi-layer board, SMD and ICs.

=== Flex PCB ===
A Flexible Printed Circuit Board (FPCB) is a thin, lightweight circuit made from flexible materials like polyimide or Parylene. It can bend or fold while maintaining reliable electrical connections and is commonly used in compact electronic devices such as smartphones, wearables, and medical equipment.

Parylene-based printed circuit boards are slightly more expensive, but offer a high material and process compatibility and improved miniaturization capability. Parylene’s dielectric loss factor is lower than that of polyimide, which makes it well-suited for high-frequency applications. Parylene’s transparency in the visible and IR spectrum also allows for applications in the field of optics and integrated photonics. Parylene-based wafer bonding also enables 3D integration processes.

Using Parylene as a substrate material specifically, ultra-thin (5 to 20 µm), flexible printed circuit boards can be manufactured. Because the material is compatible with cleanroom technologies such as photolithography, CMP, as well as wet and dry etching, electronic structures can be directly fabricated and patterned on the substrate, enabling higher-level integration schemes.

== Uses ==
Printed circuit boards have been used as an alternative to their typical use for electronic and biomedical engineering thanks to the versatility of their layers, especially the copper layer. PCB layers have been used to fabricate sensors, such as capacitive pressure sensors and accelerometers, actuators such as microvalves and microheaters, as well as platforms of sensors and actuators for Lab-on-a-chip (LoC), for example to perform polymerase chain reaction (PCR), and fuel cells, to name a few.

== Repair ==
Manufacturers may not support component-level repair of printed circuit boards because of the relatively low cost to replace compared with the time and cost of troubleshooting to a component level. In board-level repair, the technician identifies the board (PCA) on which the fault resides and replaces it. This shift is economically efficient from a manufacturer's point of view but is also materially wasteful, as a circuit board with hundreds of functional components may be discarded and replaced due to the failure of one minor and inexpensive part, such as a resistor or capacitor, and this practice is a significant contributor to the problem of e-waste.

== Legislation ==
In many countries (including all European Single Market participants, the United Kingdom, Turkey, and China), legislation restricts the use of lead, cadmium, and mercury in electrical equipment. PCBs sold in such countries must therefore use lead-free manufacturing processes and lead-free solder, and attached components must themselves be compliant.

Safety Standard UL 796 covers component safety requirements for printed wiring boards for use as components in devices or appliances. Testing analyzes characteristics such as flammability, maximum operating temperature, electrical tracking, heat deflection, and direct support of live electrical parts.

== See also ==
- Breadboard
- BT-Epoxy - resin used in PCBs
- Certified interconnect designer - qualification for PCB designers
- List of open-source EDA software for PCB design
- Occam process - solder-free circuit board manufacture method
