= Phenolic paper =

Plastic-impregnated cardboard

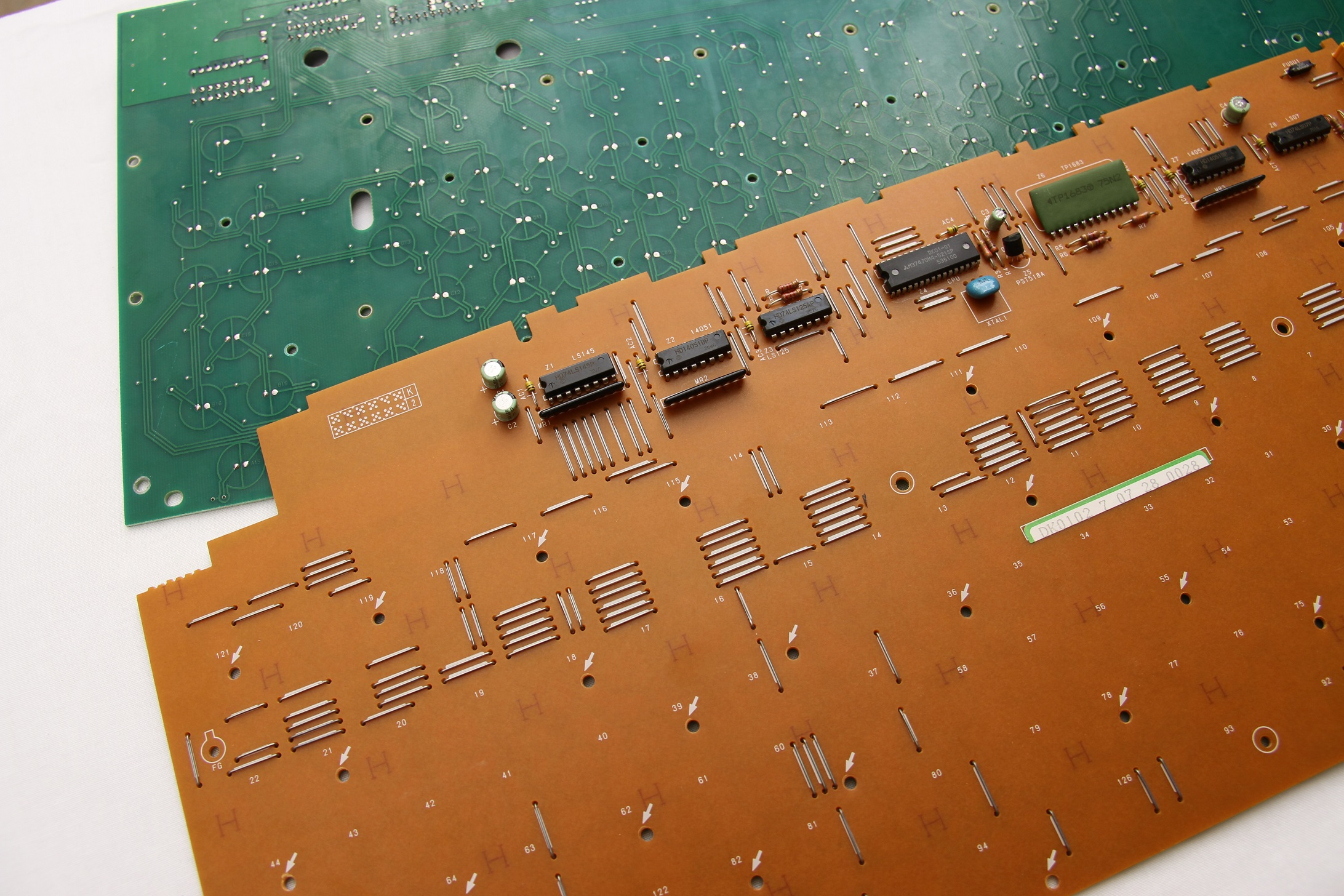
The back of two circuit boards. The brown one is an FR-2 made of paper phenol.

Phenolic paper is a paper composite material often used to make printed circuit board (PCB) substrates (the flat board to which electronic components and traces are attached). It is a very tough board made of wood fibre and phenolic polymers. It is most commonly brown in colour, and is a fibre reinforced plastic. These PCB materials are known as FR-1 and FR-2 – FR-2 is rated to 130 °C, FR-1 is rated to 105 °C.
