= Micarta =

Brand name for a fabric-plastic composite

Micarta is a brand name for composites of various fibers integrated in a thermosetting plastic. Materials such as linen, canvas, paper, fiberglass, carbon fiber, or other fabrics are used to form products for electrical and decorative applications. Micarta was developed by George Westinghouse at least as early as 1910 using phenolic resins invented by Leo Baekeland. These resins were used to impregnate paper and cotton fabric which were cured under pressure and high temperature to produce laminates. In later years this manufacturing method included the use of fiberglass fabric, and other resin types were also used. Today Micarta high-pressure industrial laminates are produced with a wide variety of resins and fibers. Common uses of modern high-pressure laminates include electrical insulators, printed circuit board substrates, and knife handles.

The term Micarta is a registered trademark of Industrial Laminates / Norplex, Inc. (dba Norplex-Micarta), but as with many trademarks, it is often used generically for similar resin impregnated fiber compounds from other manufacturers.

== Manufacturing process ==
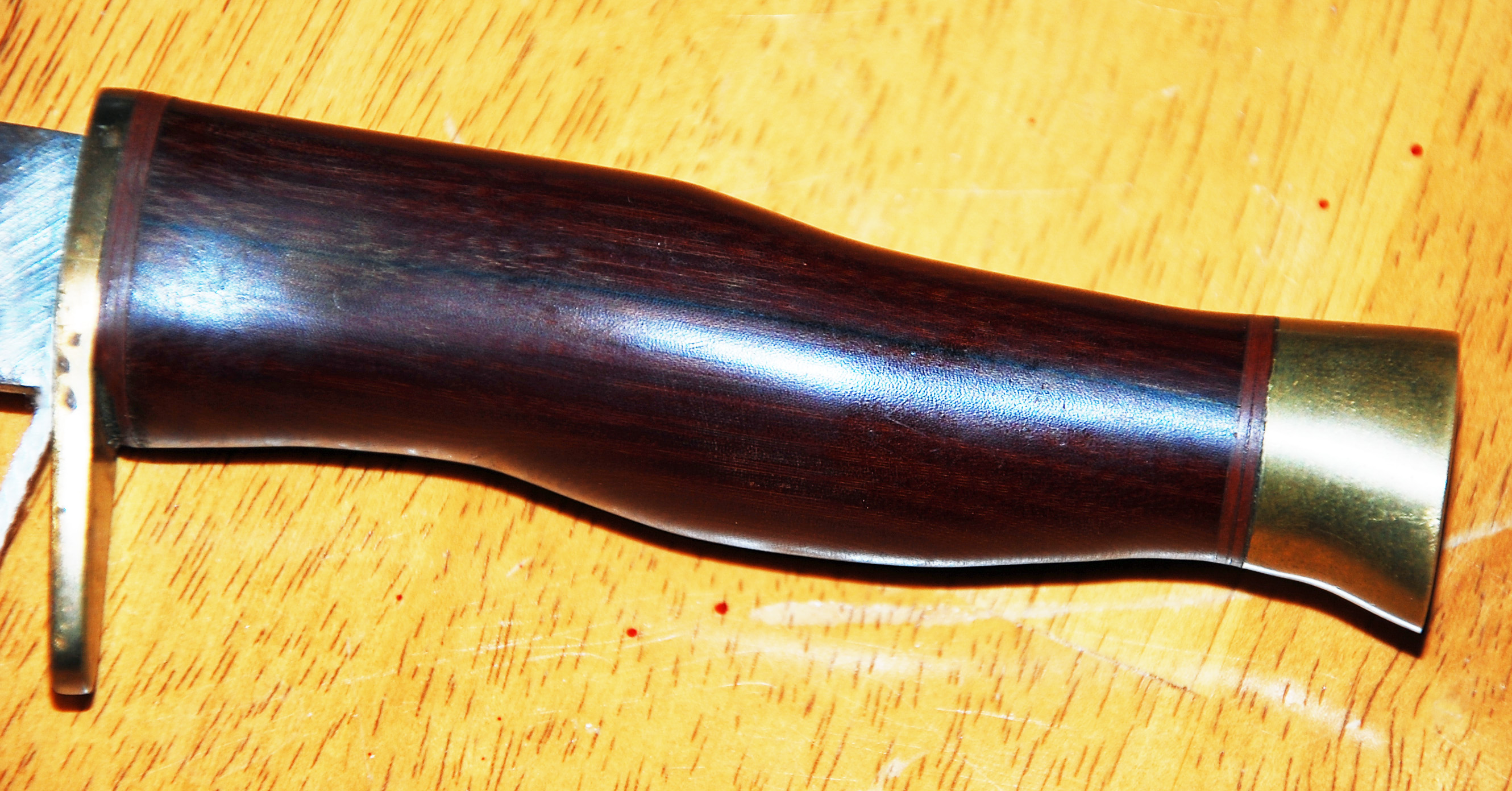
Micarta knife handle

Micarta industrial laminates are normally phenolic, epoxy, silicone, or melamine resin based thermoset materials reinforced with fiberglass, cork, cotton cloth, paper, carbon fiber or other substrates. Micarta industrial laminate sheet is a hard, dense material made by applying heat and pressure to layers of prepreg. These layers of lamination usually consist of cellulose paper, cotton fabrics, synthetic yarn fabrics, glass fabrics, or unwoven fabrics. When heat and pressure are applied to the layers, a chemical reaction (polymerization) transforms the layers into a high-pressure thermosetting industrial laminated plastic.

Micarta industrial laminates are manufactured in dozens of commercial grades.

== Applications ==
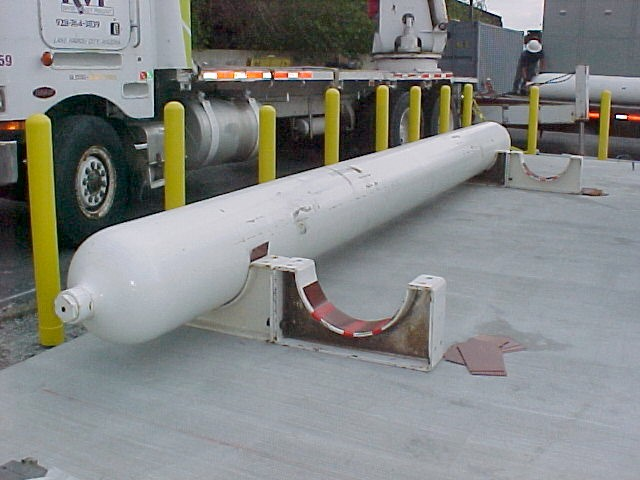
Compressed natural gas storage cylinder in the process of being installed in saddle supports using Micarta insulation as an electrical insulator.

The largest use for Micarta industrial laminates is a high strength electrical insulation in power generating and distribution equipment. Laminates are also used in heavy equipment, aerospace (such as propeller blades); automotive parts; office equipment; musical instrument components such as fingerboards and bridges; tabletops and countertops; electronics; electrical insulation between pressure vessels or piping and their supports; handles such as those of knives, BBQ and kitchen tools as well as handgun grips; guitar fingerboards, nuts and bridges; pool cues; and safety gear such as hard hats. Between 1935 and 1945, Westinghouse's Power-Aire desk fans used blades made of Micarta.

Micarta 259-2 was used as the ablation heat shield material in early ICBM warheads.

== Ownership ==
Micarta's industrial laminate division and name were purchased by Norplex in 2003, merging two of the largest industrial laminate manufactures in the United States. Norplex still manufactures Micarta and produces over 100 different versions of Micarta offered in sheet, tube, and rod forms.

== See also ==
- Composite epoxy material
- FR-4, epoxy-fiberglass PC board laminate for printed circuit boards, which has largely replaced micarta for the purpose.
- G-10
