= John Sargrove =

British engineer and automation pioneer

John Sargrove (1906–1974) was a British engineer and automation pioneer.

== Life and career ==
His parents were ethnically Hungarian, and he was originally named John Adolphe Szabadi, but changed his name to Sargrove in 1938.

While employed at British Tungsram Radio Works Ltd (originally British Tungsram Electric Lamps Ltd) he experimented with the idea of creating circuits by spraying metal onto bakelite. He was able to create resistors, capacitors, and inductors, as well as the electrical connections between them, on a single bakelite blank by this process. This work was carried out around 1936 and 1937, several years prior to the development of the printed circuit board by Paul Eisler in 1943. Sargrove also experimented with the development of a 'universal' vacuum tube. His long-term goal, however, was automating the production of radios by the development of what he termed Electronic Circuit Making Equipment (ECME).

By 1947 Sargrove had completed the design of all the ECME, and formed a company, Sargrove Electronics Ltd, to build the equipment and then produce radios. The ECME built by Sargrove produced all of the radio circuitry by the sprayed-circuit process, and assembled all of the radio parts except for inserting the vacuum tubes into their sockets and attaching the speaker, thus greatly reducing the amount of human labour required and thereby lowering the cost of the radios. An ECME device could produce three radios a minute, and even test the radio circuitry.

Sargrove continued to design increasingly sophisticated ECME to produce more complex radios, and began work on ECME for the production of televisions. However, a large order of radios by the Indian government was cancelled in 1947 following Indian self-governance, and investors withdrew their backing of Sargrove Electronics Ltd, which then went into liquidation.
