= Para tertiary butylphenol formaldehyde resin =

Names
- Preferred IUPAC name poly[4-tert-butylphenol-co-formaldehyde]
- Other names: p-tert-butylphenol-formaldehyde resin (PTBP-FR)

Identifiers
CAS Number	25085-50-1
PubChem CID	104912
CompTox Dashboard (EPA)	DTXSID7047805

Properties
Chemical formula	(C_{10}H_{14}O)_{n}·(CH_{2}O)_{m}
Molar mass	Variable
Melting point	80 °C (176 °F; 353 K)
- Except where otherwise noted, data are given for materials in their standard state (at 25 °C [77 °F], 100 kPa). Infobox references

Para tertiary butylphenol formaldehyde resin, also known as p-tert-butylphenol-formaldehyde resin (PTBP-FR), is a thermoplastic phenol-formaldehyde resin found in commercial adhesives, particularly glues used to bond leather and rubber. It has broad usage in a large variety of industries and can be found in many household textile products and craft glues. In particular, it is used in the manufacture of shoes.

== Production ==
The main ingredients of any phenol-formaldehyde resin are a phenol or substituted phenol and formaldehyde. The two main components of p-tert-butylphenol-formaldehyde resin are thus p-tert-butylphenol and formaldehyde. There have been a number of patents on their production. PTBP-FR is of resol type, formed under basic conditions using an excess of formaldehyde. It contains a mixture of oligomers, with repeating unit −CH_{2}C_{6}H_{2}(OH)(t-Bu)CH_{2}O− predominating over −CH_{2}C_{6}H_{2}(OH)(t-Bu)−. Unlike other resols, it does not cross-link when cured, as the positions para to phenol are already occupied by tert-butyl groups.

== Allergenicity ==
PTBP-FR can cause severe allergic contact dermatitis in a significant percentage of individuals who come into contact with the resin. Allergic responses are primarily caused by low molecular weight derivatives of p-tert-butylphenol, including monomeric, dimeric, trimeric, and tetrameric species. The dimers 5,5'-di-tert-butyl-2,2'-dihydroxy-3,3'-dihydroxymethyl-dibenzyl ether and 5,5'-di-tert-butyl-2,2'-dihydroxy-3-hydroxymethyl-dibenzyl ether are especially potent, demonstrating positive patch test reactions at concentrations as low as 10 ppb.

Most cases of dermatitis result from contact with shoes, watchbands, belts, wet suits, handbags, purses, wallets, hats, fabric glues, furniture and upholstery glues, wood glues, waterproof glues, rubber handled tools, dental bonding resins, box adhesives, disposable diapers, lip liner, and rubber athletic insoles. As of 2002, roughly half of all cases were attributable to occupational exposure. Use of PTBP-FR in manufacturing is ubiquitous across numerous industries and commercial products, but most commonly its usage in the manufacture of shoes is implicated in the majority of cases involving contact dermatitis.
