= Smithers-Oasis =

American manufacturer of floral foam

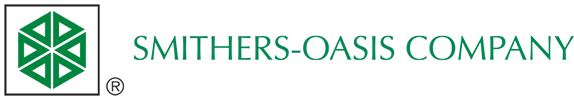
- Industry: Floristry
- Founded: 1954 in Kent, Ohio, United States
- Founder: V.L. Smithers
- Headquarters: Kent, Ohio, United States
- Products: Floral foam
- Website: www.smithersoasis.com

Smithers-Oasis is a company specializing in floristry products headquartered in Kent, Ohio, United States. The company created water-absorbing foam in 1954.

== History ==
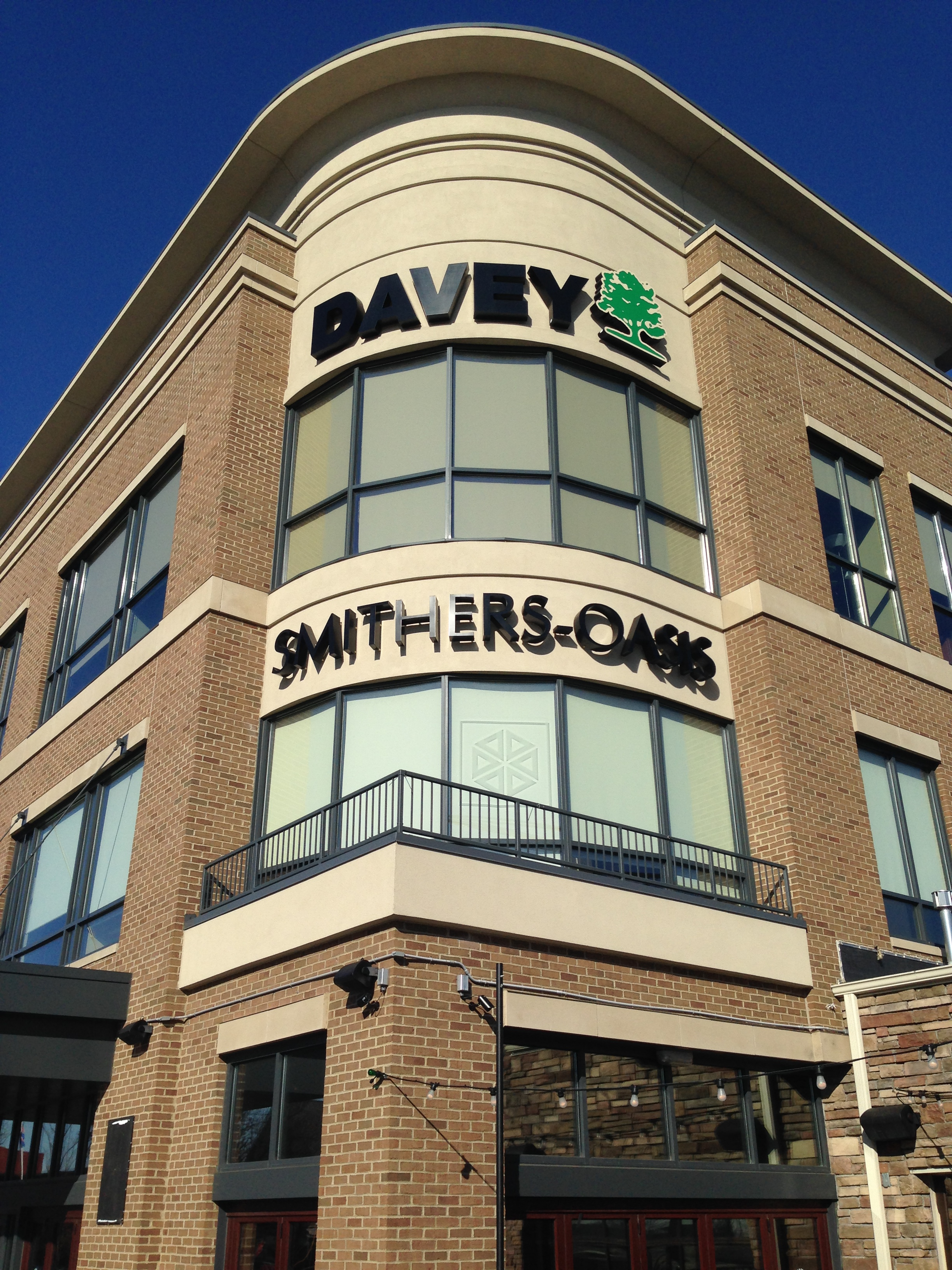
Corporate headquarters in Kent, Ohio

The company was founded in 1954 by V.L. Smithers in Kent, Ohio after he developed a water absorbent foam to use in floral arrangements. Since then, other products have been developed including floral accessories, cellular growing media, and post-harvest plant products. The company is headquartered in Kent and operates a manufacturing plant there. Corporate offices were returned to Kent in late 2013 from Cuyahoga Falls, where they had been located since 1992.

== Products ==
=== Wet floral foam ===
Oasis is a trademarked name for wet floral foam, the spongy phenolic foam used for real flower arranging. It soaks up water like a sponge and acts both as a preservative to prolong the life of the flowers and a support to hold them in place. The foam's structure is similar to that of plants and has capillary action to move water to the surface and up the stem. It is often green and in a brick shape, but can be bought in other colours and shapes.

=== Dry floral foam ===
Sahara and Sahara II are the trademarked names for dry floral foam distributed by the Smithers-Oasis Company and used for supporting arrangements of artificial flowers. They do not manufacture this product. The company also offers products using extruded polystyrene and molded urethane which are also distributed, not manufactured.

=== Colored floral foam ===
Rainbow Foam is the trademarked name for colored floral foam produced by the Smithers-Oasis in France. It doesn't contain the same formulation as the regular wet floral foam, thus requires other soaking directions before use.

== Environmental Impact ==
Oasis Maxlife floral foam is biodegradable and non-toxic for both humans and animals.

Oasis Floral Foam is a type of plastics. It is made from green fine-celled thermoset phenolic plastic foam. Prolonged exposure to formaldehyde and carbon black, two of the foam's ingredients, may cause cancer. According to the company's Material Safety Data Sheet, this product my be irritating to eyes, skin, and respiratory tract. This product does not biodegrade. Oasis Floral Foam does degrade into microplastics that are more easily dispersed in the environment and then consumed by animals.

== Other uses ==
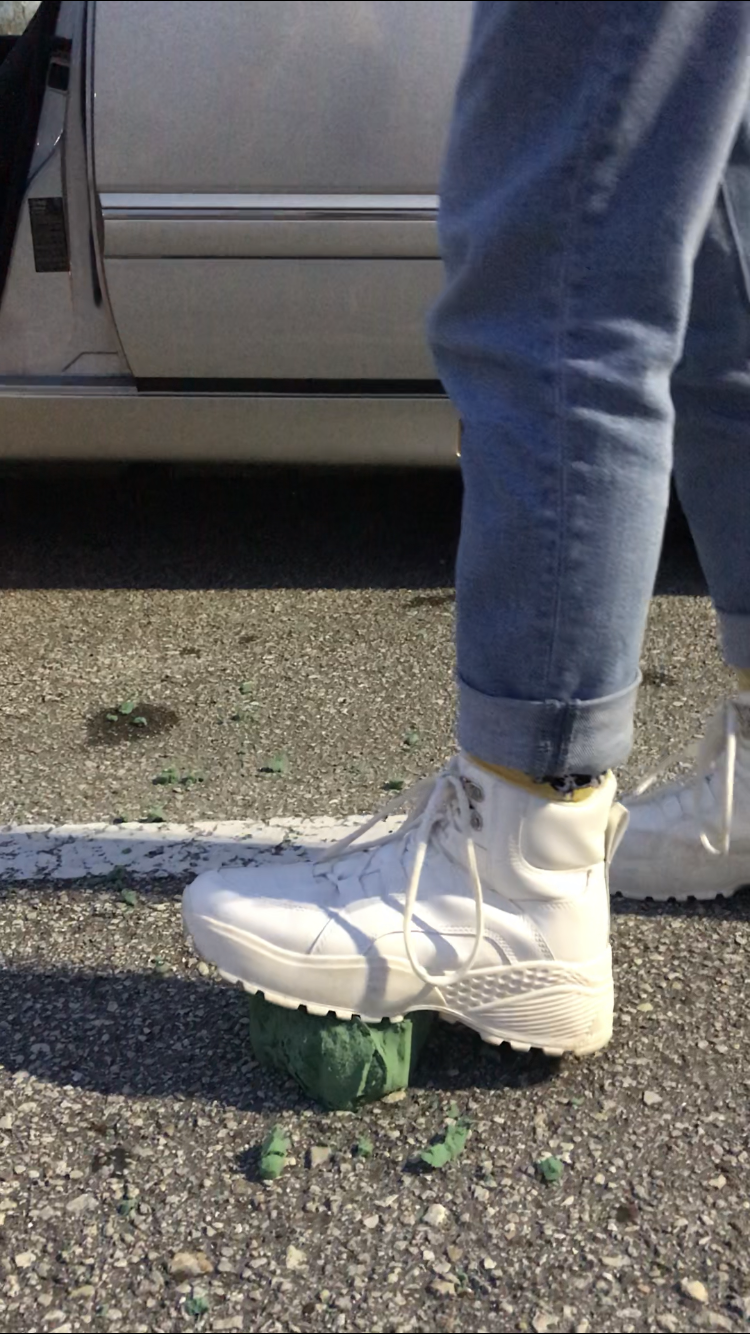
A white tennis shoe crushing wet floral foam.

Floral foam has also seen use in ASMR videos due to the crispy sounds produced from crushing it. Its increased use had led to concerns of improper disposal, leading to an increase in microplastic pollution. However, new developments to Oasis Floral Foam has removed this concern.
