= List of physical properties of glass =

Physical properties of common glasses

This is a list of some physical properties of common glasses. Unless otherwise stated, the technical glass compositions and many experimentally determined properties are taken from one large study. Unless stated otherwise, the properties of fused silica (quartz glass) and germania glass are derived from the SciGlass glass database by forming the arithmetic mean of all the experimental values from different authors (in general more than 10 independent sources for quartz glass and T_{g} of germanium oxide glass).

The list is not exhaustive.

Properties	Soda–lime glass (for containers)	Borosilicate (low expansion, similar to Pyrex, Duran)	Glass wool (for thermal insulation)	Special optical glass (similar to Lead crystal)	Fused silica	Germania glass	Germanium selenide glass
Chemical composition, wt%	74 SiO_{2}, 13 Na_{2}O, 10.5 CaO, 1.3 Al_{2}O_{3}, 0.3 K_{2}O, 0.2 SO_{3}, 0.2 MgO, 0.01 TiO_{2}, 0.04 Fe_{2}O_{3}	81 SiO_{2}, 12.5 B_{2}O_{3}, 4 Na_{2}O, 2.2 Al_{2}O_{3}, 0.02 CaO, 0.06 K_{2}O	63 SiO_{2}, 16 Na_{2}O, 8 CaO, 3.3 B_{2}O_{3}, 5 Al_{2}O_{3}, 3.5 MgO, 0.8 K_{2}O, 0.3 Fe_{2}O_{3}, 0.2 SO_{3}	41.2 SiO_{2}, 34.1 PbO, 12.4 BaO, 6.3 ZnO, 3.0 K_{2}O, 2.5 CaO, 0.35 Sb_{2}O_{3}, 0.2 As_{2}O_{3}	SiO_{2}	GeO_{2}	GeSe_{2}
Viscosity log(η, Pa·s) = A + B / (T in °C - T_{o})	550–1450 °C: A = -2.309; B = 3922; T_{o} = 291	550–1450 °C: A = -2.834; B = 6668; T_{o} = 108	550–1400 °C: A = -2.323; B = 3232; T_{o} = 318	500–690 °C: A = -35.59; B = 60930; T_{o} = -741	1140–2320 °C: A = -7.766; B = 27913; T_{o} = -271.7	515–1540 °C: A = -11.044; B = 30979; T_{o} = −837	
Glass transition temperature, T_{g}, °C	573	536	551	~540	1140	526 ± 27	395
Coefficient of thermal expansion, ppm/K, ~100–300 °C	9	3.5	10	7	0.55	7.3	
Density at 20 °C, [g/cm^{3}], x1000 to get [kg/m^{3}]	2.52	2.235	2.550	3.86	2.203	3.65	4.16
Refractive index n_{D} at 20 °C	1.518	1.473	1.531	1.650	1.459	1.608	1.7
Dispersion at 20 °C, 10^{4}×(n_{F} - n_{C})	86.7	72.3	89.5	169	67.8	145	
Young's modulus at 20 °C, GPa	72	65	75	67	72	43.3	
Shear modulus at 20 °C, GPa	29.8	28.2		26.8	31.3		
Liquidus temperature, °C	1040	1070			1715	1115	
Heat capacity at 20 °C, J/(mol·K)	49	50	50	51	44	52	
Surface tension, at ~1300 °C, mJ/m^{2}	315	370	290				
Chemical durability, Hydrolytic class, after ISO 719	3	1	3				
