= Pizza cutter =

Tool for cutting pizza into slices

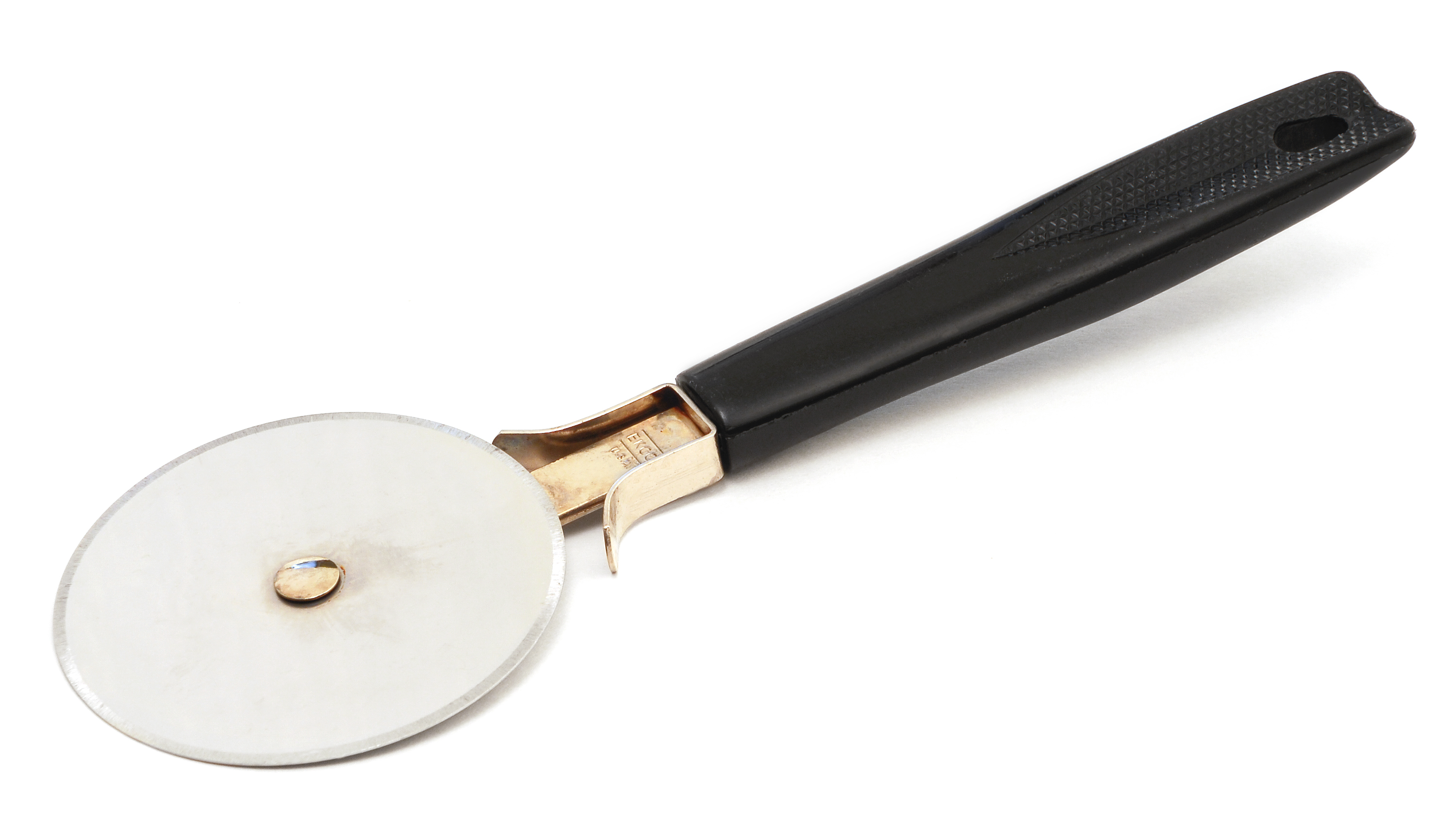
A wheel-type cutter

A pizza cutter (also known as a roller blade) is a handheld kitchen utensil that is used to cut various items into sections or slices. Due to its prevalence in the making of pizza, it has earned the name "pizza cutter". The typical pizza cutter has a rotating circular blade that is attached to a handle via an axle. The original design has been modified over the years to include different sizes, blades, handles, and uses. The typical pizza cutter is not limited to cutting pizza but also for a variety of other tasks such as cutting dough or chopping herbs.

== History ==
The Italian Silvio Pacitti invented the mezzaluna (Italian for "half moon") shaped blade in 1708. This utensil was a rounded blade that impacted its target and finished with a rolling motion across the object to create a clean cut (as opposed to dragging across the target, as with standard knives). It was intended to assist in cutting herbs and vegetables and could be found in either a single or double blade.

== Varieties ==
There are two main types of pizza cutters.

- The most common uses a wheel that rotates in a circle while a person moves the cutter in a direction that they would like to cut the pizza. People can also use the wheel pizza cutter for things such as craft work.

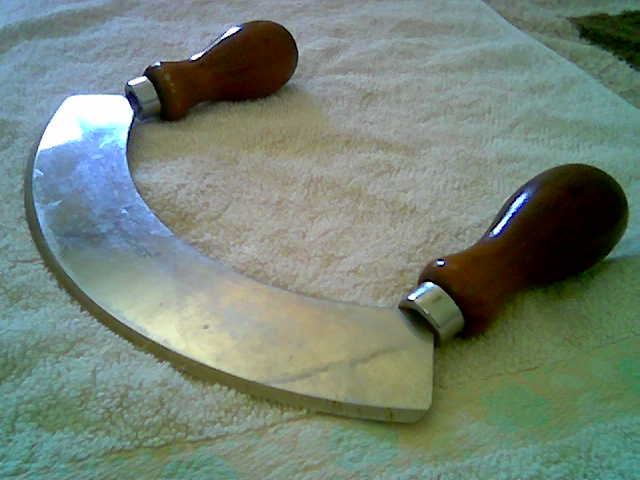
Mezzaluna with a single blade

- The other type is a large curved knife called a mezzaluna, which is rocked back and forth to cut the pizza. Some types of mezzalunas (particularly the double-bladed type) are often used to mince herbs or chop vegetables.

These two types of pizza cutters come in many different sizes.

== See also ==
- V-Cut (Depanelization)
