= 2-tert-Butylphenol =

Organic aromatic compound

Names
- Preferred IUPAC name 2-tert-Butylphenol
- Other names o-tert-Butylphenol

Identifiers
CAS Number	88-18-6
3D model (JSmol)	Interactive image
ChEBI	CHEBI:34305
ChEMBL	ChEMBL108851
ChemSpider	6657
ECHA InfoCard	100.001.643
EC Number	201-807-2
PubChem CID	6923
RTECS number	SJ8921000
UNII	NL2FPV3N0Z
UN number	3145
CompTox Dashboard (EPA)	DTXSID2026525
- InChI: InChI=1S/C10H14O/c1-10(2,3)8-6-4-5-7-9(8)11/h4-7,11H,1-3H3 Key: WJQOZHYUIDYNHM-UHFFFAOYSA-N
- SMILES: CC(C)(C)C1=CC=CC=C1O

Properties
Chemical formula	C_{10}H_{14}O
Molar mass	150.221 g·mol^{−1}
Appearance	colorless oil
Density	0.978 g/cm^{3}
Melting point	−7 °C (19 °F; 266 K)

Hazards
- GHS labelling
Pictograms	(GHS05: Corrosive) (GHS07: Exclamation mark) (GHS09: Environmental hazard)
Signal word	Danger
Hazard statements	H302, H312, H314, H332, H411
Precautionary statements	P260, P264, P270, P271, P273, P280, P301+P312, P301+P330+P331, P302+P352, P303+P361+P353, P304+P312, P304+P340, P305+P351+P338, P310, P312, P322, P330, P363, P391, P405, P501
- Except where otherwise noted, data are given for materials in their standard state (at 25 °C [77 °F], 100 kPa). Infobox references

2-tert-Butyl phenol is an organic compound with the formula (CH_{3})_{3}CC_{6}H_{4}OH. It is one of three isomeric tert-butyl phenols. It is a colorless oil that dissolves in basic water. It can be prepared by acid-catalyzed alkylation of phenol with isobutene.

== Uses ==
2-tert-Butylphenol is an intermediate in the industrial production of 2,6-di-tert-butylphenol, a common antioxidant.

Hydrogenation of 2-tert-butylphenol gives cis-2-tert-butylcyclohexanol, which when acetylated is a commercial fragrance.
