= Phenol formaldehyde resin =

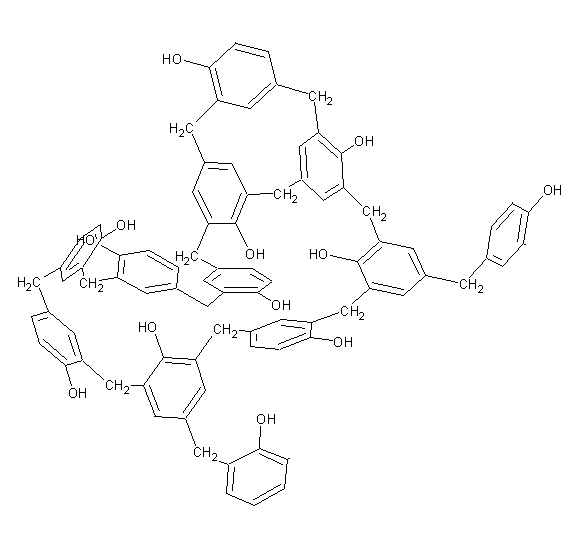
- Structure of Bakelite

Identifiers
CAS Number	9003-35-4
ChemSpider	none
ECHA InfoCard	100.105.516
CompTox Dashboard (EPA)	DTXSID2049713
- Except where otherwise noted, data are given for materials in their standard state (at 25 °C [77 °F], 100 kPa). Infobox references

Phenol formaldehyde resins (PF), also called phenolic resins or phenoplasts, are synthetic polymers obtained by the reaction of phenol or substituted phenol with formaldehyde. Used as the basis for Bakelite, PFs were the first commercial synthetic resins. They have been widely used for the production of molded products including billiard balls and laboratory countertops, and also of coatings and adhesives. They were at one time the primary material used for the production of circuit boards but have been largely replaced with epoxy resins and fiberglass cloth, as with fire-resistant FR-4 circuit board materials.

There are two main production methods. The acid-catalyzed reaction of phenol and formaldehyde, with the phenol in excess quantity, forms a prepolymer known as novolac which can be moulded and then cured with the addition of more formaldehyde and heat. The other method has instead the formaldehyde in excess and uses a base as catalyst, forming a prepolymer known as resole. There are many variations in both production and input materials that are used to produce a wide variety of resins for special purposes.

== Formation and structure ==
Phenol-formaldehyde resins, as a group, are formed by a step-growth polymerization reaction that can be either acid- or base-catalysed. Since formaldehyde exists predominantly in solution as a dynamic equilibrium of methylene glycol oligomers, the concentration of the reactive form of formaldehyde depends on temperature and pH.

Phenol reacts with formaldehyde at the ortho and para sites (sites 2, 4 and 6) allowing up to 3 units of formaldehyde to attach to the ring. The initial reaction in all cases involves the formation of a hydroxymethyl phenol:

HOC_{6}H_{5} + CH_{2}O → HOC_{6}H_{4}CH_{2}OH

The hydroxymethyl group is capable of reacting with either another free ortho or para site, or with another hydroxymethyl group. The first reaction gives a methylene bridge, and the second forms an ether bridge:

HOC_{6}H_{4}CH_{2}OH + HOC_{6}H_{5} → (HOC_{6}H_{4})_{2}CH_{2} + H_{2}O
2 HOC_{6}H_{4}CH_{2}OH → (HOC_{6}H_{4}CH_{2})_{2}O + H_{2}O

The diphenol (HOC_{6}H_{4})_{2}CH_{2} (sometimes called a "dimer") is called bisphenol F, which is an important monomer in the production of epoxy resins. Bisphenol-F can further link generating tri-, tetra- and higher phenol oligomers.

== Novolaks ==
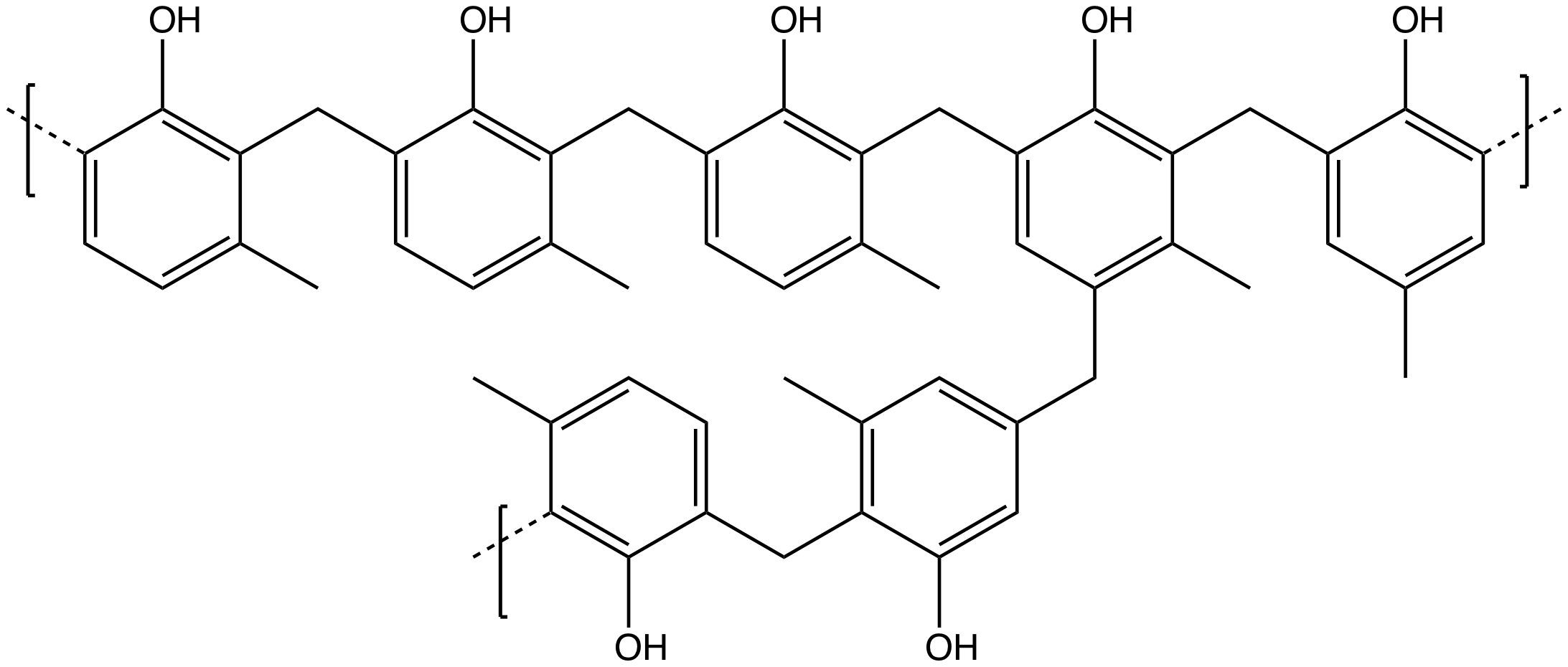
Segment of a novolak, illustrating the predominance of cresol subunits and presence of crosslinking.

Novolaks (or novolacs) are phenol-formaldehyde resins with a formaldehyde to phenol molar ratio of less than one. They are often produced using cresols (methylphenols) in place of phenol itself. The polymerization is brought to completion using acid catalysis with sulfuric acid, oxalic acid, hydrochloric acid, and rarely sulfonic acids. The phenolic units are mainly linked by methylene and/or ether groups. The molecular weights are in the low thousands, corresponding to about 10–20 phenol units. Polymers obtained from this reaction are thermoplastic and require a curing agent or hardener to form a thermoset.

Hexamethylenetetramine is a hardener added to cause crosslinking in novolac. At a temperature greater than 90 °C, it forms methylene and dimethylene amino bridges. Resoles can also be used as a curing agent (hardener) for novolac resins. In either case, the curing agent is a source of formaldehyde which provides bridges between novolac chains, eventually completely crosslinking the system.

Novolacs have multiple uses as tire tackifier, high temperature resin, binder for carbon bonded refractories, carbon brakes, photoresists and as a curing agent for epoxy resins.

== Resoles ==
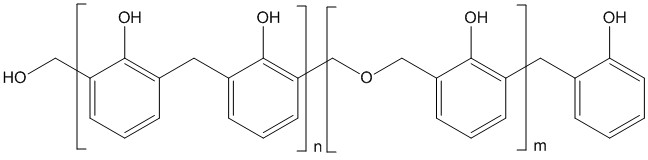
Simplified general structure of a resole

Base-catalysed phenol-formaldehyde resins are made with a formaldehyde to phenol ratio of greater than one (usually around 1.5). These resins are called resoles. Phenol, formaldehyde, water and catalyst are mixed in the desired amount, depending on the resin to be formed, and are then heated. The first part of the reaction, at around 70 °C, forms a thick reddish-brown tacky material, which is rich in hydroxymethyl and benzylic ether groups.

The rate of the base-catalysed reaction initially increases with pH, and reaches a maximum at about pH = 10. The reactive species is the phenoxide anion (C_{6}H_{5}O^{−}) formed by deprotonation of phenol. The negative charge is delocalised over the aromatic ring, activating sites 2, 4 and 6, which then react with the formaldehyde.

Being thermosets, hydroxymethyl phenols will crosslink on heating to around 120 °C to form methylene and methyl ether bridges through the elimination of water molecules. At this point the resin is a 3-dimensional network, which is typical of polymerised phenolic resins. The high crosslinking gives this type of phenolic resin its hardness, good thermal stability, and chemical imperviousness. Resoles are referred to as "one step" resins as they cure without a cross linker unlike novolacs, a "two step" resin.

Resoles are major polymeric resin materials widely used for gluing and bonding building materials. Exterior plywood, oriented strand boards (OSB), engineered high-pressure laminate are typical applications.

== Crosslinking and the formaldehyde/phenol ratio ==
When the molar ratio of formaldehyde:phenol reaches one, in theory every phenol is linked together via methylene bridges, generating one single molecule, and the system is entirely crosslinked. This is why novolacs (F:P <1) do not harden without the addition of a crosslinking agents, and why resoles with the formula F:P >1 will.

== Applications ==
Phenolic resins are found in myriad industrial products. Phenolic laminates are made by impregnating one or more layers of a base material such as paper, fiberglass, or cotton with phenolic resin and laminating the resin-saturated base material under heat and pressure. The resin fully polymerizes (cures) during this process forming the thermoset polymer matrix. The base material choice depends on the intended application of the finished product. Paper phenolics are used in manufacturing electrical components such as punch-through boards, in household laminates, and in paper composite panels. Glass phenolics are particularly well suited for use in the high speed bearing market. Phenolic micro-balloons are used for density control. The binding agent in normal (organic) brake pads, brake shoes, and clutch discs are phenolic resin. Synthetic resin bonded paper, made from phenolic resin and paper, is used to make countertops. Another use of phenolic resins is the making of duroplast, famously used in Trabant automobiles.

Phenolic resins are also used for making exterior plywood commonly known as weather and boil proof (WBP) plywood because phenolic resins have no melting point but only a decomposing point in the temperature zone of 220 °C (428 °F) and above.

Phenolic resin is used as a binder in loudspeaker driver suspension components which are made of cloth.

Higher end billiard balls are made from phenolic resins, as opposed to the polyesters used in less expensive sets.

Sometimes people select fibre reinforced phenolic resin parts because their coefficient of thermal expansion closely matches that of the aluminium used for other parts of a system, as in early computer systems and Duramold.

The Dutch painting forger Han van Meegeren mixed phenol formaldehyde with his oil paints before baking the finished canvas, in order to fake the drying out of the paint over the centuries.

Atmospheric re-entry spacecraft use phenol formaldehyde resin as a key component in ablative heat shields (e.g. AVCOAT on the Apollo modules). As the heat shield skin temperature can reach 1000-2000 °C, the resin pyrolizes due to aerodynamic heating. This reaction absorbs significant thermal energy, insulating the deeper layers of the heat shield. The outgassing of pyrolysis reaction products and the removal of charred material by friction (ablation) also contribute to vehicle insulation, by mechanically carrying away the heat absorbed in those materials.

== Trade names ==
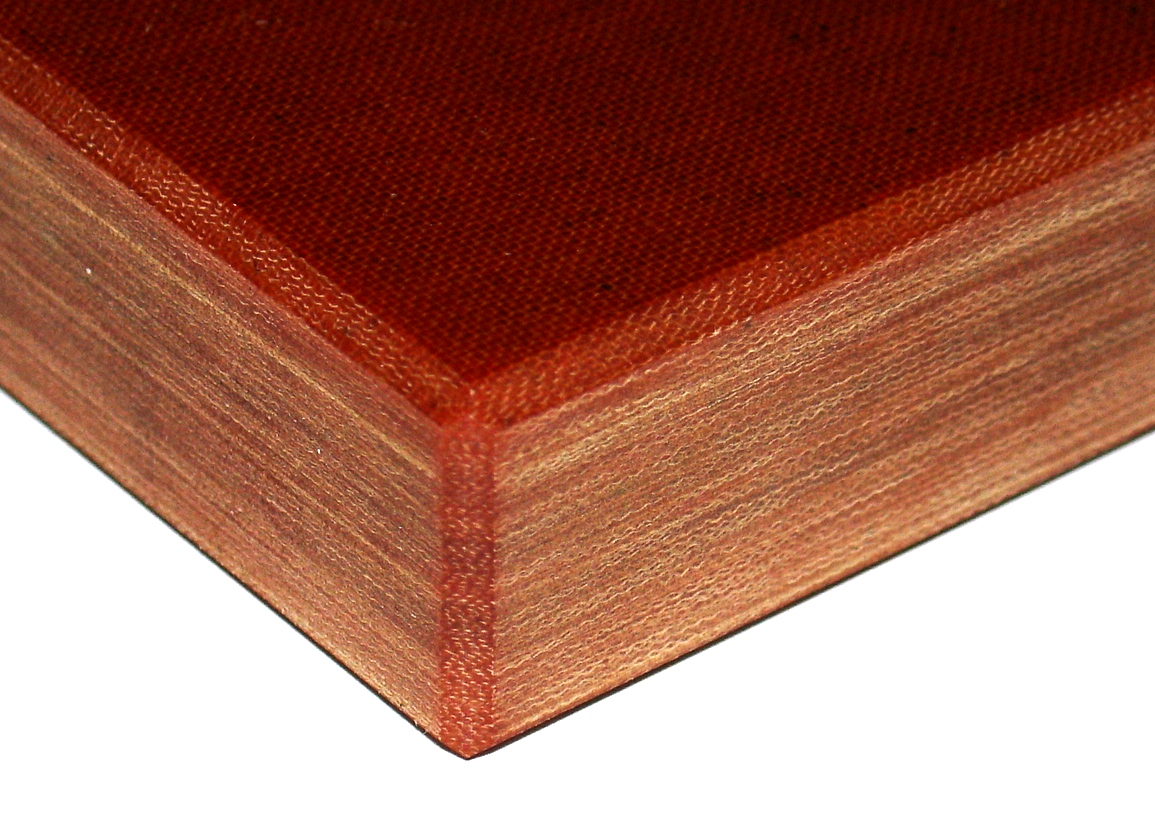
Tufnol (Novotext) plate

- Bakelite was originally made from phenolic resin and wood flour.
- Ebonol is a paper-filled phenolic resin designed as a replacement for ebony wood in stringed and woodwind instruments.
- Novotext is cotton fibre-reinforced phenolic, using randomly oriented fibres.
  - Tufnol is a laminated plastic available as sheet and rods, which is made from layers of paper or cloth which have been soaked with phenolic resin and pressed under heat. Its high resistance to oils and solvents have made it suitable for many engineering applications.
- Oasis Floral Foam is "an open-celled phenolic foam that readily absorbs water and is used as a base for flower arrangements."
- Paxolin is a resin bonded paper product long used as a base material for printed circuit boards, although it is being replaced by fiberglass composites in many applications.
- Richlite is a paper-filled phenolic resin with many uses, from tabletops and cutting-boards to guitar fingerboards.

== Biodegradation ==
Phenol-formaldehyde is degraded by the white rot fungus Phanerochaete chrysosporium and Rhodococcus phenolicus.

== See also ==
- Urea-formaldehyde
- Para tertiary butylphenol formaldehyde resin
