= FR-4 =

NEMA grade designation for glass-reinforced epoxy laminate material

FR-4 (or FR4) is a NEMA grade designation for glass-reinforced epoxy laminate material. FR-4 is a composite material composed of woven fiberglass cloth with an epoxy resin binder that is flame resistant (self-extinguishing).

"FR" stands for "flame retardant", and does not denote that the material complies with the standard UL94V-0 unless testing is performed to UL 94, Vertical Flame testing in Section 8 at a compliant lab. The designation FR-4 was created by NEMA in 1968.

FR-4 glass epoxy is a popular and versatile high-pressure thermoset plastic laminate grade with good strength to weight ratios. With near zero water absorption, FR-4 is most commonly used as an electrical insulator possessing considerable mechanical strength. The material is known to retain its high mechanical values and electrical insulating qualities in both dry and humid conditions. These attributes, along with good fabrication characteristics, lend utility to this grade for a wide variety of electrical and mechanical applications.

Grade designations for glass epoxy laminates are: G-10, G-11, FR-4, FR-5 and FR-6. Of these, FR-4 is the grade most widely in use today. G-10, the predecessor to FR-4, lacks FR-4's self-extinguishing flammability characteristics. Hence, FR-4 has since replaced G-10 in most applications.

FR-4 epoxy resin systems typically employ bromine, a halogen, to facilitate flame-resistant properties in FR-4 glass epoxy laminates. Some applications where thermal destruction of the material is a desirable trait will still use G-10 non flame resistant.

== Properties ==
Which materials fall into the "FR-4" category is defined in the NEMA LI 1-1998 standard. Typical physical and electrical properties of FR-4 are as follows. The abbreviations LW (lengthwise, warp yarn direction) and CW (crosswise, fill yarn direction) refer to the conventional perpendicular fiber orientations in the XY plane of the board (in-plane). In terms of Cartesian coordinates, lengthwise is along the x-axis, crosswise is along the y-axis, and the z-axis is referred to as the through-plane direction. The values shown below are an example of a certain manufacturer's material. Another manufacturer's material will usually have slightly different values. Checking the actual values, for any particular material, from the manufacturer's datasheet, can be very important, for example in high frequency applications.

Parameter	Value
Specific gravity/density	1.850 g/cm^{3} (0.0668 lb/cu in)
Water absorption	−0.125 in < 0.10%
Temperature index	140 °C (284 °F)
Thermal conductivity, through-plane	0.29 W/(m·K), 0.343 W/(m·K)
Thermal conductivity, in-plane	0.81 W/(m·K), 1.059 W/(m·K)
Rockwell hardness	110 M scale
Bond strength	> 1,000 kg (2,200 lb)
Flexural strength (A; 0.125 in) – LW	> 415 MPa (60,200 psi)
Flexural strength (A; 0.125 in) – CW	> 345 MPa (50,000 psi)
Dielectric breakdown (A)	> 50 kV
Dielectric breakdown (D48/50)	> 50 kV
Dielectric strength	20 MV/m
Relative permittivity (A)	4.4
Relative permittivity (D24/23)	4.4
Dissipation factor (A)	0.017
Dissipation factor (D24/23)	0.018
Dielectric constant (ε_{r})	3.9 – 4.7, 4.4 @ 1 GHz (Supplier Isola)
Loss tangent (tanδ)	0.02 – 0.03, 0.030 @ 1 GHz
Glass transition temperature	Can vary, but is over 120 °C
Young's modulus – LW	3.5×10^{6} psi (24 GPa)
Young's modulus – CW	3.0×10^{6} psi (21 GPa)
Coefficient of thermal expansion – x-axis	1.4×10^{−5} K^{−1}
Coefficient of thermal expansion – y-axis	1.2×10^{−5} K^{−1}
Coefficient of thermal expansion – z-axis	7.0×10^{−5} K^{−1}
Poisson's ratio – LW	0.136
Poisson's ratio – CW	0.118
LW sound speed	3602 m/s
CW sound speed	3369 m/s
LW acoustic impedance	6.64 MRayl

where:

LW
Lengthwise
CW
Crosswise
PF
Perpendicular to laminate face

== Applications ==
FR-4 is a common material for printed circuit boards (PCBs). A thin layer of copper foil is typically laminated to one or both sides of an FR-4 glass epoxy panel. These are commonly referred to as copper clad laminates. The copper thickness or copper weight can vary and so is specified separately.

FR-4 is also used in the construction of relays, switches, standoffs, busbars, washers, arc shields, transformers and screw terminal strips.

== See also ==
- FR-2
- Polyimide
- G-10 (material)
