= Soviet integrated circuit designation =

Standardized computer chip nomenclature

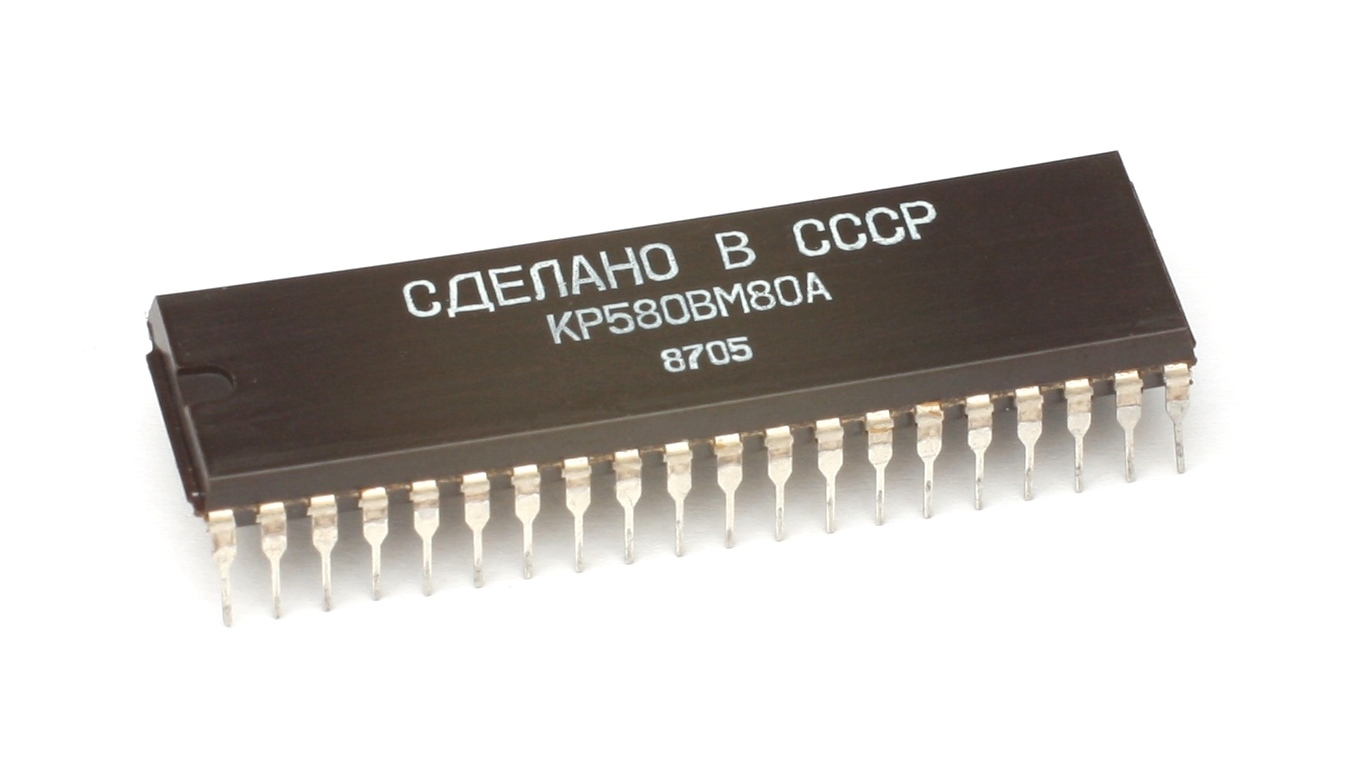

The Soviet integrated circuit designation is an industrial specification for encoding the names of integrated circuits manufactured in the Soviet Union and the Post-Soviet states. 25 years after the dissolution of the Soviet Union, a number of manufacturers in Russia, Belarus, Ukraine, Latvia, and Uzbekistan still use this designation.

The designation uses the Cyrillic alphabet which sometimes leads to confusion where a Cyrillic letter has the same appearance as a Latin letter but is romanized as a different letter. Furthermore, for some Cyrillic letters the Romanization is ambiguous.

== History ==
The nomenclature for integrated circuits has changed somewhat over the years as new standards were published:

- 1968 – NP0.034.000 (Russian: НП0.034.000)
- 1973 – GOST 18682—73 (Russian: ГОСТ 18682—73)
- 1980 – OST 11.073.915—80 (Russian: ОСТ 11.073.915—80)
- 2000 – OST 11.073.915—2000 (Russian: ОСТ 11.073.915—2000)
- 2010 – GOST RV 5901-005—2010 (Russian: ГОСТ РВ 5901-005—2010)

Throughout this article the standards are referred to by the year they came into force. Before 1968 each manufacturer used its own integrated circuit designation. Following the dissolution of the Soviet Union in 1991, the standards were not as strictly enforced, and a number of manufacturers introduced manufacturer-specific designations again. These were typically used in parallel with the standards. However, integrated circuits for military, aerospace, and nuclear applications in Russia still have to follow the standard designation. Underlining this, the 2010 standard is explicitly labelled a Russian military standard. Beside Russia the 2010 standard is applied in Belarus as well. Companies in Ukraine mostly stayed with the 1980 standard and prefixed the designation with the letter У (U), e.g. УМ5701ВЕ51. The 1980 standard was published in Ukraine as DSTU 3212—95 (Ukrainian: ДСТУ 3212-95). Bulgarian designations for bipolar integrated circuits, e.g. 1УО709С, look confusingly similar to the 1968 Soviet designations but the standards differ. The functional group is also indicated by two letters in the Cyrillic alphabet and many groups were obviously copied from the Soviet standard (АГ, ИД, ИЕ, ЛБ, ЛН, ЛП, МП, ПК, СА, УС). Some subgroups differ (ТД, УМ, УО) and some groups are completely different (НС, ОИ, РН). For the number after the functional group there is no concept of a series. Instead, that number usually matches the Western counterpart (e.g. the 1УО709С is equivalent to a μA709).

Also as a consequence of the dissolution of the Soviet Union, COCOM restrictions were lifted and Russian integrated circuit design firms gained access to foundries abroad. In that sense it could be argued that the importance of the Soviet designation has spread across the globe. When foundries are not able to label the circuit in the Cyrillic alphabet then the Latin alphabet is used (e.g. KF1174PP1). The sanctions in response to the Russian invasion of Ukraine ended this international co-operation in 2022.

In general, devices already in production when a new standard came out kept their old designation. However, in some case devices were renamed:

- When the 1980 standard was published, devices named after the 1968 standard and still in production were renamed, e.g. К1ЛБ553 to К155ЛА3. As in this example, the renaming was often fairly straightforward: The two parts of the serial number were combined (1 and 55 to 155), the functional group remained unchanged or was converted as in the table below (ЛБ to ЛА), and the variant number remained unchanged (3). In some series the renaming was more complicated. This change affected many series (e.g. 101, 116, 118, 122, 133, 140, 153, 155, 174, 237, 501).
- Before the introduction of a package designation in 1980 the suffix П (P) was used in some series to indicate a plastic package (as opposed to the then more-common ceramic package). In 1983 the package designation was changed for the 531 series (e.g. К531ЛА19П to КР531ЛА19). Other series were similarly renamed at some point (e.g. К501ХЛ1П to КР501ХЛ1).
- Before the definition of group В (V) in 1980 computing devices were all assigned subgroup ИК (IK), e.g. microprocessors (КР580ИК80А), peripheral devices (КР580ИК51А). With the introduction of group В the devices in the 580 series were renamed (to КР580ВМ80А and КР580ВВ51А, respectively) in 1986.
- Since the publication of the 2000 standard, some devices have been labeled with the package designation according to the new standard, e.g. КР1407УД2 to К1407УД2Р and КФ1407УД2 to К1407УД2Т.
- Starting in 2016, certain newer devices were renamed according to the 2010 standard, e.g. 1967ВЦ2Ф to 1967ВН028 and 1586ПВ1АУ to 1583НВ025 (note the change of the series).

== Structure of the designation ==
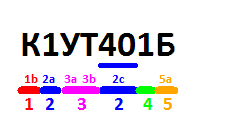
1968

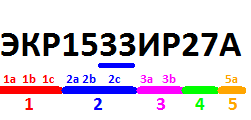
1973 / 1980

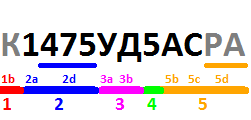
2000

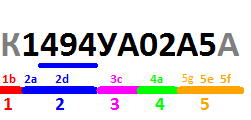
2010

Elements:

- 1 – Prefix (zero to three letters)
  - 1a – Export designation: The letter Э (E) here indicates an integrated circuit intended for export with a pin spacing of 2.54mm (1/10") or 1.27mm (1/20"). If this element is empty then the device has the Soviet (metric) spacing of 2.5mm or 1.25mm between pins.
  - 1b – Application area: The letter К (K) here indicates an integrated circuit for commercial and consumer applications (with requirements according to GOST 18725—83). If this element is empty then the device is intended for harsher environments (e.g. extended temperature range) which is also referred to as military acceptance (ВП).
  - 1c – Package designation (1980) (Note that the letters Э and К are not valid package designations. If this element is empty then the package is simply not specified in the designation, i.e. it could be any of the packages.)
- 2 – Series (three or four digits)
  - 2a – Manufacturing technology (one digit):
    - Monolithic integrated circuits: 1, 5, or 6
    - Monolithic integrated circuits – bare chip without package: 7
    - Hybrid integrated circuits: 2, 4, or 8
    - Other integrated circuits (e.g. thin film): 3
    - Multi-chip modules: 9
  - 2b – For four-digit series the second digit of the number of the series has significance as well:
    - Series for household electronics: 0
    - Series of analogue devices: 1
    - Series of operational amplifiers: 4
    - Series of digital devices: 5
    - Series of memory devices: 6
    - Series of microprocessor families: 8
  - 2c – Number of the series (2 digits): The numbers of the series are assigned sequentially and have no further meaning. Devices in a series have some characteristic in common although it varies from one series to another which characteristic that is (e.g. logic family for logic gates, instruction set for microprocessors).
  - 2d – Number of the series (2 or 3 digits): The 2000 / 2010 standards do not assign a special meaning to the second digit of a 4-digit series.
- 3 – Functional Group (two letters)
  - 3a – Group
  - 3b – Subgroup within the group: All groups have the subgroup П (P) for "others", that is for devices that fall into the group but not into any of the other defined subgroups.
  - 3c – Functional Group (2010): The functional groups for the 2010 standard are in a separate table since the change from 2000 to 2010 is far more drastic than any of the previous changes.
- 4 – Variant within the functional subgroup (one to four digits): Usually the variant numbers are assigned sequentially for devices within the subgroup (e.g. ЛА1, ЛА2, ЛА3, etc.). In some series the variant number matches the last two or three digits of the designation of its Western counterpart (e.g. К500ЛК117 and MC10117).
  - 4a – For the 2010 standard, the variant is always 2 digits in length, with a leading zero if necessary. When there is no version letter then the variant appears to be 3 digits in length (e.g. 1906ВМ016) but the third digit is actually the package designation (element 5e).
- 5 – Suffix
  - 5a – Version (one letter, А to Я except З and Й): This optional element indicates versions of an integrated circuit with different electrical or thermal characteristics (e.g. switching speed, voltage range, etc.). It can also indicate an improved version of a device (e.g. К580ИК80 vs. К580ИК80А). Before 1980 the suffix П (P) was sometimes used to indicate a version in a plastic package instead of a ceramic package (e.g. К145ИК2П, К531ЛА19П) or a round metal can (e.g. К144ИР1П).
  - 5b – Version (one letter, А to М except З and Й): This element is omitted if there is only one version of a device.
  - 5c – Package designation (2000) (one letter, Н to Я): If this element is empty then the package is simply not specified in the designation, i.e. it could be any of the packages. Note that the letter ranges for version and package designation do not overlap.
  - 5d – Manufacturer designation (two letters)
  - 5e – Package designation (2010) (one digit or letter Н)
  - 5f – Package variant (one letter; А, В, С, Е, Н, К, М, Р, Т, or Х): If variants of an integrated circuit have the same parameters and package designation but differ in pinout or number of pins, then this package variant letter is added (e.g. 5400ТР045 and 5400ТР045А). Some vendors assign version letters outside the allowed range (e.g. 1395ЕН10Ж5Б).
  - 5g – Version (one letter; А, В, С, Е, К, М, Р, Т, or Х): This element is omitted if there is only one version of a device. Note that for the 2010 standard a different package is indicated by element 5f instead. Some vendors assign version letters outside the allowed range (e.g. 1494УА02Б3).

== Functional groups ==
Group		Description				Example	
Russian	English	1968	1973	1980	2000	Original	Equivalent
А	A		Pulse shapers and drivers				
АА	AA	—	Address line drivers (esp. for magnetic-core memory)			К170АА7	SN75327
АГ	AG	—	Square wave pulse shapers (including monostable multivibrators)			К555АГ4	74LS221
АИ	AI	—	—	—	Time interval shaper (timer)	1512АИ1У	
АН	AN	—	—	—	Voltage pulse shaper		
АП	AP	—	Other pulse shapers (e.g. digital buffers including tri-state buffers, bubble memory drivers, CCD drivers)			ЭКР1533АП5	74ALS244
АР	AR	—	Bit-line drivers (esp. for magnetic-core memory)			146АР1	
АТ	AT	—	—	—	Current pulse shaper		
АФ	AF	—	Pulse shapers for special waveforms			К174АФ5	
Б	B		Delay devices (Note: In 1973 group Ш was moved to Б and then in 2000 to Э. Unfortunately, this makes some transcriptions ambiguous since both Е and Э are transcribed as E.)		Array of cells		
БА	BA	—	—	—	Array of analogue cells (Note: Subgroup ХН was moved to БА in 2000 and then to ТМ in 2010.)	Н1451БА1У-А502	
БК	BK	—	—	—	Array of mixed-signal cells (Note: Subgroup ХТ was moved to БК in 2000 and then to ТР in 2010.)	1451БК2У	
БМ	BM	—	Passive delay device		—		
БП	BP	—	Other delay device		Other array of cells (e.g. gate array plus processor)	К5512БП1Ф	
БР	BR	—	Active delay device (e.g. bucket-brigade device)		—	КА528БР2	
БЦ	BTs, BC	—	—	—	Array of digital cells (gate array) (Note: Subgroup ХМ was moved to БЦ in 2000 and then to ТН in 2010.)	5585БЦ1У	
В	V			Computing devices (Note: Before the definition of group В (V) in 1980 computing devices were all assigned subgroup ИК (IK), e.g. microprocessors (КР580ИК80А), peripheral devices (КР580ИК51А). With the introduction of group В the devices in the 580 series were renamed (to КР580ВМ80А and КР580ВВ51А, respectively) in 1986.)			
ВА	VA	—	—	Bus interface		КР580ВА86	Intel 8286
ВБ	VB	—	—	Synchronization device (e.g. arbiter)		КР1810ВБ89	Intel 8289
ВВ	VV	—	—	Input / output interface (e.g. serial or parallel interface)		КР580ВВ55А	Intel 8255
ВГ	VG	—	—	Controller (e.g. memory controller, video display controller)		КР1810ВГ88	Intel 8288
ВД	VD	—	—	—	Controller with digital inputs and outputs	1875ВД1Т	Intel 80C186
ВЕ	VE	—	—	Single-chip microcontroller		КМ1816ВЕ48	Intel 8748
ВЖ	VZh	—	—	Specialized device (e.g. error correction circuit)		К1800ВЖ5	Motorola MC10905
ВИ	VI	—	—	Timer device, real-time clock		КР580ВИ53	Intel 8253
ВК	VK	—	—	Combined device (e.g. bus controller, GPIB controller)		КР580ВК28	Intel 8228
ВМ	VM	—	—	Microprocessor (Note: Initially digital signal processors (DSP) were assigned subgroup ВМ (VM, e.g. 1867ВМ2). In 2000 the new subgroup ВЦ (VTs) was added (e.g. 1867ВЦ2АТ). In 2010 DSP were moved to subgroup ВН (VN).)		КР580ВМ80A	Intel 8080
ВН	VN	—	—	Programmable interrupt controller		КР580ВН59	Intel 8259
ВП	VP	—	—	Other computing devices (e.g. gate array)		К1801ВП1	
ВР	VR	—	—	Extender for e.g. word size, number of ports, number of interrupt lines, available arithmetic operations (esp. a multiplier)		КМ1804ВР1	AMD Am2902
ВС	VS	—	—	Microprocessor section, esp. bit-slice		КР1804ВС1	AMD Am2901
ВТ	VT	—	—	Memory controller		КР1810ВТ37	Intel 8237
ВУ	VU	—	—	Microcode control device		М1804ВУ4	AMD Am2909
ВФ	VF	—	—	Data transformation functions (calculation of e.g. CRC, Fourier transform)		1815ВФ3	
ВХ	VKh, VX, VH	—	—	Devices for calculators		К145ВХ1	
ВЦ	VTs, VC	—	—	—	Digital signal processor	1867ВЦ10Т	TMS320F240x
ВЮ	VYu	—	—	—	Controller with analogue inputs and outputs	К1055ВЮ1Т	
ВЯ	VYa	—	—	—	Digital signal processor with analogue inputs and outputs	1879ВЯ1Я	
Г	G	Signal generators and oscillators					
ГГ	GG	—	Square wave generators (including astable multivibrators and blocking oscillators)			КР531ГГ1	74S124
ГЛ	GL	—	Sawtooth wave generators (e.g. for CRT deflection circuits)			К174ГЛ1	TDA1170
ГМ	GM	—	Noise generators			К1316ГМ1У	
ГН	GN	—	—	—	Programmable signal generators	1316ГН2Н4	
ГП	GP	—	Other signal generators			КМ1012ГП1	MM5555
ГС	GS	Sine wave generators (including harmonic oscillators)				К277ГС1	
ГФ	GF	Signal generators for special waveforms (including generators for multiple waveforms)				К174ГФ2	XR2206
Д	D	Detectors and demodulators					
ДА	DA	Amplitude modulation detectors				235ДА1	
ДИ	DI	Pulse modulation detectors					
ДК	DK	—	—	—	Frequency-phase modulation detectors		
ДН	DN	—	—	—	Voltage detector (monitor)	К1230ДН1БР	MC34161
ДП	DP	Other detectors				К1230ДП46П	MC34064
ДС	DS	Frequency modulation detectors				К2ДС241	
ДФ	DF	Phase modulation detectors				К1102ДФ1	MC4044
Е	E	Power supply devices					
ЕА	EA	—	—	—	Positive fixed-voltage linear regulator		
ЕВ	EV	—	Rectifiers			К299ЕВ1	
ЕГ	EG	—	—	—	Negative adjustable-voltage linear regulator	1349ЕГ1У	LM137
ЕД	ED	—	—	—	Dual-polarity symmetric fixed-voltage linear regulator		
ЕЕ	EE	—	—	—	Voltage supervisor, reset circuit	1363ЕЕ1Т	MAX709L
ЕИ	EI	—	—	—	Negative fixed-voltage linear regulator	1343ЕИ5У	7905
ЕК	EK	—	—	Switched-mode power supply devices		К1156ЕК1АП	LM2596
ЕЛ	EL	—	—	—	Dual-polarity asymmetric fixed-voltage linear regulator		
ЕМ	EM	—	Electric power conversion devices (e.g. thyristor controller)			КР1182ЕМ2	
ЕН	EN	Linear voltage regulators				КР142ЕН8А	7808
ЕП	EP	Other power supply devices (e.g. charge pump devices)				КР1168ЕП1	ICL7660
ЕР	ER	—	—	—	Positive adjustable-voltage linear regulator	1325ЕР1У	AMS1117
ЕС	ES	—	—	Power supply systems			
ЕТ	ET	Constant-current sources				УР1101ЕТ51	TSM1051
ЕУ	EU	—	—	Controller for switched-mode power supplies		КР1033ЕУ2	TDA4605
ЕФ	EF	—	—	—	Adjustable-voltage switched-mode power supply devices	К1290ЕФ1АП	LM2576-ADJ
Ж	Zh	Multi-functional devices (Note: In 1973 group Ж was replaced with group Х.)					
ЖА	ZhA	Analog multi-functional devices (Note: Analog multi-functional devices were moved in 1973 from subgroup ЖА to ХА and then in 2010 to ТА.)	—	—	—	К2ЖА375	
ЖВ	ZhV	Analog and logical multi-functional devices (Note: In 1973 the subgroups ЖВ, ЖЕ, and ЖК were combined into subgroup ХК. In 2010 digital multi-functional devices were moved to subgroup ТК.)	—	—	—		
ЖЕ	ZhE	Analog and pulse multi-functional devices	—	—	—		
ЖГ	ZhG	Logical and pulse multi-functional devices (Note: In 1973 the subgroups ЖГ, ЖИ, and ЖЛ were combined into subgroup ХЛ. In 2010 digital multi-functional devices were moved to subgroup ТВ.)	—	—	—	К1ЖГ453	
ЖИ	ZhI	Pulse multi-functional devices	—	—	—		
ЖК	ZhK	Analog, logical, and pulse multi-functional devices	—	—	—		
ЖЛ	ZhL	Logical multi-functional devices	—	—	—	K5ЖЛ012	
И	I	Digital circuits					
ИА	IA	—	—	Arithmetic logic unit (Note: Before the introduction of subgroup ИА in 1980, many ALU devices had already been assigned subgroups ИК (e.g. КР531ИК2) or ИП (e.g. К155ИП3, 564ИП3, КР1530ИП14).)		1815ИА1	
ИВ	IV	—	Encoder (Note: In 1973 encoders were moved from subgroup ИШ to subgroup ИВ.)			1564ИВ3	54HC147
ИД	ID	Decoder				КР1533ИД4	74ALS155
ИЕ	IE	Counter				533ИЕ7	54LS193
ИК	IK	Combination of digital circuits				К145ИК1901	
ИЛ	IL	Half adder				K5ИЛ011	
ИМ	IM	—	Full adder (Note: In 1973 full adders were moved from subgroup ИС to subgroup ИМ.)			КМ155ИМ3	6483
ИН	IN	—	—	—	Interface receiver, transmitter, or transceiver	5559ИН1Т	MAX232
ИП	IP	Other digital circuits (e.g. parity bit checker, multiplier)				К155ИП3	74181
ИР	IR	Register, shift register				К561ИР2	4015
ИС	IS	Full adder	—	—	—	1ИС061А	
ИФ	IF	—	—	—	Function expander (e.g. multiplier)	1825ИФ1У	
ИШ	ISh	Encoder	—	—	—	К5ИШ011	
К	K	Switches and Multiplexers					
КД	KD	Diode-based switch	—	—	—		
КЗ	KZ	Opto-electronic switch	—	—	—		
КН	KN	—	Analogue switches and Multiplexers for voltages (Note: The distinction between voltage switches (КН) and current switches (КТ) is somewhat unclear. There are analogue switches and multiplexers in both subgroups.)			КР590КН1	
КП	KP	Other switches and multiplexers (especially digital; also optocouplers)				К561КП1	4052
КТ	KT	Transistor-based switch	Analogue switches and Multiplexers for currents			К561КТ3А	4066
Л	L	Logic gates					
ЛА	LA	—	NAND gates (Note: With the introduction of subgroups ЛА and ЛЕ in 1973 most devices from subgroup ЛБ were re-labelled (e.g. К1ЛБ553 to К155ЛА3). It appears that subgroup ЛБ was kept in the standard for devices from subgroup ЛБ that fit neither in ЛА nor in ЛЕ (e.g. 134ЛБ2 with 2 NAND gates and 1 NOT gate).)			К155ЛА3	7400
ЛБ	LB	NAND gates and NOR gates				К134ЛБ1	
ЛД	LD	—	Expander (Note: In 1973 expander circuits were moved from subgroup ЛП to subgroup ЛД.)			К155ЛД1	7460
ЛЕ	LE	—	NOR gates			КР1533ЛЕ1	74ALS02
ЛИ	LI	AND gates				КР531ЛИ3	74S11
ЛК	LK	AND-OR-NOT/AND-OR gates (Note: All known ECL devices in subgroup ЛК are listed as OR-AND-NOT instead of AND-OR-NOT. The equivalent Motorola devices (e.g. Motorola MC10117 for К500ЛК117) are also listed as OR-AND-NOT. Similarly, ECL devices in subgroup ЛС are listed as OR-AND instead of AND-OR (e.g. К500ЛС118, equivalent to Motorola MC10118).)				199ЛК3	
ЛЛ	LL	OR gates				К555ЛЛ1	74LS32
ЛМ	LM	—	OR-NOT/OR gates			1500ЛМ101	Fairchild F100101
ЛН	LN	NOT gates				136ЛН1	54L04
ЛП	LP	Expander	Other gates (e.g. XOR gates, majority function gates) (Note: In 1973 the catch-all subgroup ЛЭ was moved to ЛП.)			К555ЛП5	74LS86
ЛР	LR	AND-OR-NOT gates				КР531ЛР11	74S51
ЛС	LS	AND-OR gates				К561ЛС2	4019
ЛЭ	LE	Other gates	—	—	—	К1ЛЭ941	
М	M	Modulators					
МА	MA	Amplitude modulators (e.g. ring modulator)				КР140МА1	
МИ	MI	Pulse modulators				К854МИ1	
МП	MP	Other modulators (e.g. quadrature amplitude modulator)				1324МП1У	AD8346
МС	MS	Frequency modulators				219МС2	
МФ	MF	Phase modulators				К1327МФ1У	
Н	N	Arrays of electronic components					
НД	ND	Diode array				542НД1	
НЕ	NE	Capacitor array				820НЕ1Б	
НК	NK	Array with a combination of components				2НК041	
НП	NP	—	Array of other components				
НР	NR	—	Resistor array (Note: In 1973 resistor arrays were moved from subgroup НС to subgroup НР.)			К301НР1А	
НС	NS	Resistor array	—	—	—	3НС011А	
НТ	NT	Transistor array				КР198НТ5Б	
НФ	NF	—	—	Array with a specific function (e.g. resistor ladder)		317НФ1	
П	P	Signal converters					
ПА	PA	—	Digital-to-analogue converter (Note: In 1973 D/A converters were moved from subgroup ПД to subgroup ПА and then in 2010 to НА.)			КР572ПА7Б	AD7541
ПВ	PV	—	Analogue-to-digital converter (Note: In 1973 A/D converters were moved from subgroup ПК to subgroup ПВ and then in 2010 to НВ.)			1108ПВ1	TDC1013J
ПД	PD	Decoding converter (incl. Digital-to-analogue converter)	Pulse duration converter			К1102ПД1	
ПЕ	PE	—	—	Analogue frequency multiplier			
ПК	PK	Coding converter (incl. Analogue-to-digital converter)	—	—	—	К1ПК201	
ПК	PK	—	—	Analogue frequency divider (Note: For the 1980 standard subgroup ПК is listed in but not in.)		К1055ПК1Т1	
ПЛ	PL	—	—	Frequency synthesizer		КР1508ПЛ1	NJ88C30
ПМ	PM	Signal shape converter	Power converter (including attenuators)			КР1446ПМ1	
ПН	PN	Voltage converter		Voltage or current converter (Note: Subgroup ПН was moved to НН in 2010)		К252ПН1	
ПП	PP	Other converter (including photovoltaic optocouplers)				КР572ПП2	ICL7104
ПР	PR	—	Code converter			К155ПР7	74185
ПС	PS	Frequency converter (including frequency mixers, analog multipliers) (Note: Subgroup ПС was moved to НС in 2010)				К174ПС1	
ПТ	PT	—	—	—	Digital potentiometer	1315ПТ11Т	AD8400
ПУ	PU	Signal level converter (including impedance matching, logic voltage level shifters)				К561ПУ4	4050
ПФ	PF	Phase converter (Note: For the 1980 standard subgroup ПФ is listed in but not in.)			Functional signal converter (e.g. digital autocorrelator)	5862ПФ1Н4	
ПЦ	PTs, PC	—	—	Digital frequency divider		К555ПЦ1	74LS292
Р	R		Memory devices (Note: In 1973 group Я was replaced with group Р.)				
РА	RA	—	Analogue memory	Associative memory		К589РА04	Intel 3104
РВ	RV	—	Matrix of ROM elements (e.g. diode matrix) (Note: In 1974, subgroup ЯМ was split into РВ and РМ.)			К539РВ1А	
РГ	RG	—	—	—	FIFO (Note: Initially FIFO and multi-port devices were included in subgroup РП. In 2000 they were assigned the separate subgroups РГ and РК, respectively.)	1642РГ1РБМ	IDT7205L
РД	RD	—	—	—	DRAM (Note: In 2000 subgroup РУ was split into РУ and РД, with РУ from then on limited to SRAM.)	1654РД2	MT48LC4M16A2P
РЕ	RE	—	ROM (including PROM) (Note: In 1980 subgroup РЕ was split into РЕ, РР, РТ, and РФ, with РЕ from then on limited to mask ROM. In РР and РТ are listed for the 1973 standard. This is somewhat implausible, as early PROMs were placed in subgroup РЕ (e.g. К555РЕ4 or К500РЕ149).)	Mask ROM		К155РЕ21	74187
РК	RK	—	—	—	Multi-ported RAM (e.g. dual-ported RAM)	1642РК1УБМ	IDT7005
РМ	RM	—	Matrix of RAM elements			К188РМ1	
РН	RN	—	—	—	NVRAM		
РП	RP	—	Other memory devices (e.g. dual-ported RAM)		Other memory devices	К1800РП6	Motorola MC10806
РР	RR	—	—	EEPROM	EEPROM or flash memory with a parallel interface (Note: Initially subgroup РР was used for all EEPROM and Flash devices, regardless of the interface. In 2000 subgroup РС was introduced for devices with a serial interface and subgroup РР was limited to devices with a parallel interface.)	КМ1609РР1	2816
РС	RS	—	—	—	EEPROM or flash memory with a serial interface	1644PC1ATБM	24FC65
РТ	RT	—	—	PROM		530РТ1	54S287
РУ	RU	—	RAM (DRAM or SRAM)		SRAM	КР537РУ16А	6264
РФ	RF	—	—	EPROM		КМ573РФ8А	27256
РЦ	RTs, RC	—	—	Bubble memory		К1602РЦ2Б	
С	S	Comparators					
СА	SA	Amplitude (signal level) comparator (Note: In 1980 amplitude comparators were moved from subgroup СА to subgroup СК.)		Voltage comparator		К1401СА1	LM339
СВ	SV	Timing comparator				К2СВ381	
СК	SK	—	—	Amplitude (signal level) comparator (including sample-and-hold circuits)		КР1100СК3	LF398
СП	SP	—	Other comparator (especially digital comparator)		Other comparator	К555СП1	74LS85
СС	SS	Frequency comparator				К284СС2Б	
СФ	SF	Phase comparator (Note: For the 1980 standard subgroup СФ is listed in but not in.)			—		
СЦ	STs	—	—	—	Digital comparator		
Т	T	Triggers / Flip-Flops					
ТВ	TV	—	JK flip-flops			К555ТВ6	74LS107
ТД	TD	Dynamic flip-flops					
ТК	TK	Combination of triggers / flip-flops				K5TK011	
ТЛ	TL	—	Schmitt triggers (Note: In 1973 Schmitt triggers were moved from subgroup ТШ to subgroup ТЛ.)			К555ТЛ2	74LS14
ТМ	TM	—	D flip-flops			КР1533ТМ2	74ALS74
ТП	TP	—	Other triggers / flip-flops			290ТП1	
ТР	TR	RS flip-flops				КР1533ТР2	74ALS279
ТС	TS	T flip-flops (Note: In 1973 T flip-flops were moved from subgroup ТС to subgroup ТТ.)	—	—	—	2ТС051	
ТТ	TT	—	T flip-flops			6500ТТ1	
ТШ	TSh	Schmitt triggers	—	—	—	К1ТШ181Г	
У	U	Amplifiers					
УБ	UB	Video amplifier	—	—	—	К1УБ181Б	
УБ	UB	—	—	—	Instrumentation amplifier	К1463УБ1Р	
УВ	UV	—	Radio frequency (high frequency) amplifier			171УВ2	μA733
УГ	UG	—	—	—	Low-noise amplifier		
УД	UD	—	Operational amplifier or Differential amplifier (Note: Until 1973 both differential and operational amplifiers were included in subgroup УТ. In 1980 differential amplifiers were moved out of subgroup УД into their own subgroup УС.)	Operational amplifier		КР140УД7	μA741
УЕ	UE	—	Unity gain buffer (e.g. emitter follower) (Note: In 1973 unity gain buffers were moved from subgroup УЭ to subgroup УЕ.)			КР1436УЕ1	
УИ	UI	Pulse amplifier				КР1054УИ1	TBA2800
УК	UK	—	—	Wideband amplifier (e.g. video amplifier)		К174УК1	TCA660
УЛ	UL	—	Read amplifier (e.g. for magnetic core memory, magnetic tape, magnetic disks)			КР1075УЛ1	TA7784P
УМ	UM	—	Indicator amplifier			564УМ1	4054
УН	UN	—	Audio frequency (low frequency) amplifier			КР1438УН2	LM386
УП	UP	Other amplifier (e.g. log amplifier, limiter, gyrator)				174УП2	TL441CN
УР	UR	—	Intermediate-frequency amplifier			К174УР1	TBA120
УС	US	Sine wave amplifier	—	Differential amplifier		К157УС1	
УТ	UT	DC amplifier				КР119УТ1	
УУ	UU	—	—	—	Programmable-gain amplifier	К1463УУ1	AD620
УФ	UF	—	—	—	Functional amplifier (e.g. Log amplifier)	1313УФ1АУ	
УЭ	UE	Unity gain buffer (e.g. emitter follower)	—	—	—	К2УЭ182	
Ф	F	Filters					
ФА	FA	—	—	—	Adaptive filter		
ФБ	FB	—	—	—	Band-pass filter (Note: In 1973 band-pass filters were moved from subgroup ФП to subgroup ФЕ, and then in 2000 to subgroup ФБ.)		
ФВ	FV	High-pass filter				528ФВ1	
ФГ	FG	Band-stop filter (Note: For 1968 lists ФГ for band-stop filters while lists ФС. In 1973 band-stop filters were moved to subgroup ФР.)	—	—	—		
ФЕ	FE	—	Band-pass filter		—	811ФЕ1	
ФМ	FM	—	—	—	Programmable filter		
ФН	FN	Low-pass filter				И1146ФН1	
ФП	FP	Band-pass filter	Other filter			КР1146ФП1	MK5912
ФР	FR	—	Band-stop filter				
ФС	FS	Smoothing filter	—	—	—		
ФУ	FU	—	—	—	Universal filter	1478ФУ1Т	MAX274
Х	Kh, X, H		Multi-functional devices				
ХА	KhA, XA, HA	—	Analog multi-functional devices			КР1568ХА3	TDA4555
ХБ	KhB, XB, HB	—	—	—	Multifunctional device for radio, television, tape recorders, displays	К1879ХБ1Я	
ХВ	KhV, XV, HV	—	—	—	Multi-functional device for automotive electronics	К1323ХВ1Р	L497B
ХД	KhD, XD, HD	—	—	—	Multi-functional device for telecommunications	1892ХД1Я	
ХИ	KhI, XI, HI	—	—	Array of analogue cells (Note: Group ХИ is somewhat dubious. For the 1980 standard it is listed in while give ХН instead for arrays of analogue cells.)	Multi-functional device for photo- and video cameras		
ХК	KhK, XK, HK	—	Combination of multifunctional devices (including mixed-signal multi-functional devices)			КР1051ХК1	TDA8432
ХЛ	KhL, XL, HL	—	Digital multi-functional devices			КР1568ХЛ2	TDA3048
ХМ	KhM, XM, HM	—	—	Array of digital cells (gate array)	—	1515ХМ1	
ХН	KhN, XN, HN	—	—	Array of analogue cells	—	Н1451ХН3-А502	
ХП	KhP, XP, HP	—	Other multi-functional devices (e.g. programmable logic devices)		Other multi-functional devices (Note: Subgroup ХП was moved to ТХ in 2010.)	КР1556ХП4	PAL16R4
ХР	KhR, XR, HR	—	—	—	Multi-functional circuit for household devices	К1331ХР1П	
ХС	KhS, XS, HS	—	—	—	Programmable logic devices (Note: Subgroup ХС was moved to ТС in 2010.)	5577ХС2Т	Actel RH1020
ХТ	KhT, XT, HT	—	—	Array of mixed-signal cells	—	5515ХТ1У	
ХХ	KhKh, XX, HH	—	—	—	Multi-functional devices for power electronics	1474ХХ3Т	HCPL316J
Ц	Ts, C			Charge-coupled device image sensors			
ЦЛ	TsL, CL	—	—	One-dimensional (linear) image sensor		1200ЦЛ3	CCD131
ЦМ	TsM, CM	—	—	Two-dimensional image sensor		К1200ЦМ1	CCD211
ЦП	TsP, CP	—	—	Other image sensor			
Ч	Ch				Transducers / Sensors		
ЧВ	ChV	—	—	—	Humidity sensor		
ЧГ	ChG	—	—	—	Gas sensor		
ЧД	ChD	—	—	—	Pressure sensor	К1245ЧД1Н3	
ЧИ	ChI	—	—	—	Ionizing radiation sensor		
ЧМ	ChM	—	—	—	Mechanical displacement sensor (Note: Subgroup ЧМ was moved to НМ in 2010)	1243ЧМ3Н4	
ЧП	ChP	—	—	—	Other sensor	К5331ЧП01Т	
ЧТ	ChT	—	—	—	Temperature sensor (Note: Subgroup ЧТ was moved to НТ in 2010)	1019ЧТ4У	LM135
ЧЭ	ChE	—	—	—	Electromagnetic field sensor		
Ш	Sh	Delay devices					
ШП	ShP	Other delay device	—	—	—		
ШС	ShS	Active or passive delay device	—	—	—		
Э	E				Delay devices		
ЭМ	EM	—	—	—	Passive delay device		
ЭП	EP	—	—	—	Other delay device		
ЭР	ER	—	—	—	Active delay device (e.g. bucket-brigade device)		
Я	Ya	Memory devices					
ЯЛ	YaL	Magnetic memory device	—	—	—		
ЯП	YaP	Other memory device (e.g. RAM or ROM memory element)	—	—	—	K5ЯП011	
ЯМ	YaM	Matrix of memory elements (RAM or ROM)	—	—	—	К1ЯМ881	

=== Functional groups (2010) ===
Group		Description	Example	
Russian	English	2010	Original	Equivalent
А	A	Signal generators and oscillators		
АН	AN	Programmable signal generators	5025АН015	
АС	AS	Sine wave generators (including harmonic oscillators)	1508АС01А5	
В	V	Computing devices		
ВВ	VV	Input / output interface (e.g. serial or parallel interface)	2011ВВ034	
ВК	VK	Microcontroller	1921ВК035	LM4F132
ВМ	VM	Microprocessor	1907ВМ014	
ВН	VN	Digital signal processor	1967ВН034	ADSP-TS201
ВХ	VKh, VH	Other computing devices	5022ВХ014	
Е	E	Power supply devices		
ЕА	EA	Adjustable-voltage Switched-mode power supply devices	5320ЕА015	ADP3050
ЕВ	EV	Fixed-voltage Switched-mode power supply devices	5319ЕВ025	
ЕМ	EM	Negative fixed-voltage linear regulator	5321ЕМ06А1	79Mxx
ЕН	EN	Positive fixed-voltage Linear voltage regulator	1380ЕН013	
ЕР	ER	Positive adjustable-voltage linear regulator	1378ЕР014	
ЕС	ES	Voltage reference devices	1369ЕС01В4	
ЕТ	ET	Constant current sources	3005ЕТ015	
ЕУ	EU	Controller for switched-mode power supplies	1363ЕУ045	
ЕХ	EKh, EX	Other power supply devices	K5300ЕХ025	
К	K	Switches and Multiplexers		
КВ	KV	Opto-electronic switch	2609КВ014	
КИ	KI	Intelligent switch (power switch with protection circuits)	К1376КИ021	BTS141
КН	KN	Analogue switches and Multiplexers	5023КН015	ADG731
КР	KR	Switch with galvanic isolation	3012КР014	
КТ	KT	Current switch	5333КТ014	μPD16305
КХ	KKh, KX	Other switches and multiplexers	1923КХ028	
Н	N	Signal converters		
НА	NA	Digital-to-analogue converter	430НА014	
НВ	NV	Analogue-to-digital converter	5023НВ04В5	
НМ	NM	Mechanical displacement sensor	К1382НМ025	
НН	NN	Voltage or current converter	К5331НН015	
НС	NS	Frequency converter	5546НС015	
НТ	NT	Temperature sensor	5306НТ015В	DS18B20
НХ	NKh, NX	Other converters	К5331НХ011	
Р	R	Memory devices		
РА	RA	SRAM	1669РА03Н4	ACT-S512K8
РЕ	RE	NVRAM	1666РЕ014	
РР	RR	EEPROM or Flash memory with a parallel interface	9023РР018	
РС	RS	EEPROM or Flash memory with a serial interface	5578РС015	
РТ	RT	PROM	5578РТ015	
С	S	Comparators		
СА	SA	Voltage comparator	1495СА065	
СХ	SKh, SX	Other comparator (including supply voltage supervisors)	5322СХ085	
Т	T	Multi-functional devices		
ТА	TA	Analog multi-functional devices		
ТВ	TV	Digital multi-functional devices	5861ТВ01Н4	
ТК	TK	Combination of multifunctional devices (including mixed-signal multi-functional devices)	5201ТК015	
ТМ	TM	Array of analogue cells		
ТН	TN	Array of digital cells (gate array)	5529ТН114	
ТР	TR	Array of mixed-signal cells	5400ТР045А	
ТС	TS	Programmable logic devices	5578ТС024	
ТХ	TKh, TX	Other multi-functional devices	1888ТХ018	
У	U	Amplifiers		
УА	UA	Operational amplifier	1494УА02Б3	
УМ	UM	Functional amplifier (e.g. Log amplifier)	1259УМ015	AD640
УН	UN	Power amplifier	К1496УН014	TDA2822
УР	UR	Intermediate-frequency amplifier	5421УР015	
УС	US	Differential amplifier	544УС015	
УХ	UKh, UX	Other amplifier	1288УХ025	

== Packages ==
=== Package designation (1973) ===
The package of an integrated circuit was generally not indicated in the 1973 designation, except:

- Bare chips without a package received a series number in the 7xx range, e.g. K712RV2-1 (К712РВ2-1).
- The suffix П (P) was sometimes used to indicate a version in a plastic package instead of a ceramic package (e.g. К145ИК2П, К531ЛА19П) or a round metal can (e.g. К144ИР1П).
- Less common than П, the suffix М (M) was sometimes used to indicate a ceramic package and Т (T) for a metal-ceramic package (e.g. К500ТМ133М and К500ТМ133Т, respectively, instead of К500ТМ133 in a plastic package).

=== Package designation (1980) ===
Package		Description
Russian	English	Description
А	A	Plastic flatpack
Б	B	Bare chip without package
Е	E	Metal-polymer dual in-line package (DIP)
И	I	Glass-ceramic flatpack
Л	L	Pin grid array (PGA) or ball grid array (BGA)
М	M	Metal-ceramic dual in-line package (DIP)
Н	N	Ceramic leadless chip carrier
Р	R	Plastic dual in-line package (DIP)
С	S	Glass-ceramic dual in-line package (DIP)
Ф	F	Small outline package

=== Package designation (2000) ===
Package		Description
Russian	English	Description
Н	N	Bare chip without package
П	P	Single in-line package (SIP), zig-zag in-line package (ZIP)
Р	R	Dual in-line package (DIP)
С	S	Round metal can package
Т	T	Flatpack, small outline package (SOP), quad flat package (QFP)
У	U	Chip carrier
Ф	F	Pin grid array (PGA)
Х	Kh, X	ISO 7816 smart cards
Я	Ya	Ball grid array (BGA)

=== Package designation (2010) ===
Package		Description
Russian	English	Description
1		Single in-line package (SIP), zig-zag in-line package (ZIP)
2		Dual in-line package (DIP)
3		Round metal can package
4		Flatpack, small outline package (SOP), quad flat package (QFP)
5		Chip carrier
6		Pin grid array (PGA)
7		ISO 7816 smart cards
8		Ball grid array (BGA)
Н	N	Bare chip without package

=== Bare chips ===
For bare chips without a package an additional digit indicates the constructive variant. For the 1973 and 1980 standards the variant digit is appended with a dash after the designation (e.g. К712РВ2-1 and Б533ТМ2-2, respectively). For the 2000 and 2010 standards the variant digit follows immediately after the package designation N (e.g. 5862ПФ1Н4 and 1374МХ01Н1, respectively).

Constructive variant	Description
1	with flexible wires (flying wire)
2	on polyamide carrier tape (film bonding technology)
3	with rigid wires (beam lead technology)
4	on a wafer (uncut)
5	on a wafer, cut without loss of orientation (e.g. pasted on a carrier)
6	with bonding pads without wires

== Manufacturer designation ==
A manufacturer designation was introduced only with the 2000 standard. As part of the type designation the manufacturer is required only for a second-source integrated circuit that was "developed and produced according to an independently developed design and technological documentation, and corresponding to the technical requirements of the originally developed original microcircuit". Manufacturer logos are more common.

Designation		Manufacturer
Russian	English	Manufacturer
АК	AK	Almaz, Kotovsk, Russia
АМ	AM	Angstrem, Zelenograd, Russia
АР	AR	AS Alfa, Riga, Latvia
ББ	BB	OAO "BZPP", Bolkhov, Russia
БМ	BM	OAO "Integral", Minsk, Belarus
БС	BS	SIT, Bryansk, Russia
ВК	VK	AO "Voshod", Kaluga, Russia
ВН	VN	NPP "Vostok", Novosibirsk, Russia
ВЭ	VE	NIIET, Voronezh, Russia
ГГ	GG	OAO "GZPP", Georgiyevsk, Russia
ГР	GR	TOO "Gelion", Ryazan, Russia
ДЛ	DL	AOOT "Disk", Livny, Russia
ДМ	DM	OAO "Diod", Moscow, Russia
ИМ	IM	"Transistor" branch of OAO "Integral", Minsk, Belarus
ИП	IP	AO ZPP, Ioshkar-Ola, Russia
ИС	IS	AO NII "Inmikrotekh", Saransk, Russia
ИУ	IU	OAO "Iskra", Ulyanovsk, Russia
КБ	KB	ZAO "Group Kremny", Bryansk, Russia
МД	MD	AO PMZR, Moscow, Russia
МК	MK	ZAO "OKB MEL", Kaluga, Russia
ММ	MM	OAO "NIIME and Mikron", Moscow, Russia
МО	MO	Optron, Moscow, Russia
МФ	MF	FREP MEI, Moscow, Russia
МЭ	ME	"Eldag", Makhachkala, Russia
НИ	NI	MVC / NIIIS, Nizhny Novgorod, Russia
НМ	NM	NII "Delta", Moscow, Russia
НН	NN	AO "NZPP", Novosibirsk, Russia
НП	NP	NZPP-KBR, Nalchik, Russia
НС	NS	NPP "Salyut", Nizhny Novgorod, Russia
НТ	NT	AO "NIIPP", Tomsk, Russia
ПМ	PM	OAO "Pulsar", Moscow, Russia
РА	RA	RD Alfa, Riga, Latvia
СО	SO	Orbita, Saransk, Russia
СП	SP	ZAO Svetlana Semiconductors, Saint Petersburg, Russia
ЭВ	EV	OAO "VZPP-S", Voronezh, Russia
ЭП	EP	OAO "Exiton", Moscow, Russia

Other manufacturers which as of 2016 used a version of the Soviet integrated circuit designation include NTC Module, MCST, ELVEES Multicore, Fizika, Sapfir, NPK TTs, and Progress, all of them in Moscow, as well as PKK Milandr, Soyuz, and NIITAP in Zelenograd, SKTB ES Voronezh, Proton and Proton-Impuls Oryol, Planeta Novgorod, NIIEMP Penza, Eltom Tomilino, Krip Tekhno Alexandrov, DELS Minsk, Kvazar Kyiv, Krystal Kyiv, Elektronni Komponenti Ivano-Frankivsk, Dnepr Kherson, and Foton Tashkent.

== Other markings ==
Although not strictly part of the designation, a number of markings are often found on integrated circuit packages:

Marking		Description
Russian	English	Description
ОП	OP	Engineering or pre-production sample
ОС	OS	Military acceptance, higher quality and reliability
ОСД	OSD	Military acceptance, higher quality and reliability, extended lifetime
ОСМ	OSM	Military acceptance, highest quality and reliability, available in only in small quantities
С	S	Military acceptance, used in the 1970s instead of ОС

Military acceptance here means that the integrated circuit can be used in applications where its failure would be catastrophic and where repair or exchange is difficult or impossible (e.g. aerospace applications).

For mask-programmed devices (e.g. gate arrays, mask-programmed single-chip microcontrollers, mask ROMs) a three- or four-digit mask number follows the type designation (e.g. К1801ВП1-014).

For bare chips a one-digit constructive variant identifier follows the type designation.

A date code is usually printed on the package. In the early 1970s the date code consisted of a Roman numeral for the month and a two-digit year (e.g. IX 72). Later the month was given as one or two digits (e.g. 5-73 or 0386). In the late 1980s most plants switched to a 4-digit code with a 2-digit year followed by a 2-digit month (e.g. 8909) or a 2-digit week (e.g. 9051). Overall, the date code format was not strictly enforced. Several series of integrated circuits (e.g. 1408, 1821) bore an IEC 60062 letter and digit code (e.g. A1 for January 1990).

== Romanization ==
The Romanization of Russian is standardized, but there are at least 12 standards to choose from. Fortunately, the Soviet integrated circuit designation uses a subset of the Cyrillic alphabet where only a few letters are ambiguous:

- Ж: Ž, **Zh**
- Х: **X**, **H**, Ch, **Kh**
- Ц: **C**, Cz, **Ts**, Tc
- Ч: Č, **Ch**

The more-common romanizations in bold are given as alternatives in the above tables.

Е and Э are both romanized as E.

The French romanization of Russian and the German romanization of Russian differ in some letters from the one used in English. For instance, the Russian КР580ВМ80A becomes KR580VM80A in English and French but KR580WM80A in German literature.

== See also ==
- 7400 series: Second sources in Europe and the Eastern Bloc
- List of 7400-series integrated circuits
- List of Soviet microprocessors
- Pro Electron: Integrated circuits
- Russian tube designations
