= ARM Cortex-A5 =

Family of microprocessor cores with ARM microarchitecture

General information
- Launched: 2011
- Designed by: ARM Holdings
- Common manufacturer: TSMC

Performance
- Max. CPU clock rate: 233 MHZ to 1.00 GHZ

Cache
- L1 cache: 4–64 KB/4–64 KB

Architecture and classification
- Instruction set: ARMv7-A

Physical specifications
- Cores: 1–4

The ARM Cortex-A5 is a 32-bit processor core licensed by ARM Holdings implementing the ARMv7-A architecture announced in 2009.

== Overview ==
The Cortex-A5 is intended to replace the ARM9 and ARM11 cores for use in low-end devices. The Cortex-A5 offers features of the ARMv7 architecture focusing on internet applications e.g. VFPv4 and NEON advanced SIMD.

Key features of the Cortex-A5 core are:

- Single-issue, in-order microarchitecture with an 8-stage pipeline
- NEON SIMD instruction set extension (optional)
- VFPv4 floating-point unit (optional)
- Thumb-2 instruction set encoding
- Jazelle RCT
- 1.57 DMIPS / MHz

== Chips ==
Several system-on-chips (SoC) have implemented the Cortex-A5 core, including:

- Actions Semiconductor ATM7029 (gs702a) is a quad-core Cortex-A5 configuration
- AMD APUs include a Cortex-A5 as a security co-processor
- Amlogic S805, M805 and A111
- Analog Devices ADSP-SC57x, ADSP-SC58x series ARM Cortex-A5 + SHARC+ multicore DSP
- Atmel SAMA5Dxx
- Freescale Vybrid Series
- NTC Module 1879VM8Ya (penta-core Cortex-A5, up to 800 MHz)
- Qualcomm Snapdragon S1 MSM7x25A / MSM7x27A (up to 1.0GHz + Adreno 200)
- Qualcomm Snapdragon S4 Play
- Samsung Exynos 7420 (Cortex-A5 as an audio DSP)
- Spreadtrum SC8810 (single core A5 1 GHz + Mali400 GPU)
- All AMD CPUs since the Zen microarchitecture contain a Cortex-A5 as a Platform Security Processor

== See also ==
- ARM architecture
- Comparison of ARMv7-A microarchitectures
- JTAG
- List of applications of ARM microarchitectures
- List of ARM microarchitectures
