= Encoder (digital) =

Digital electronic circuit

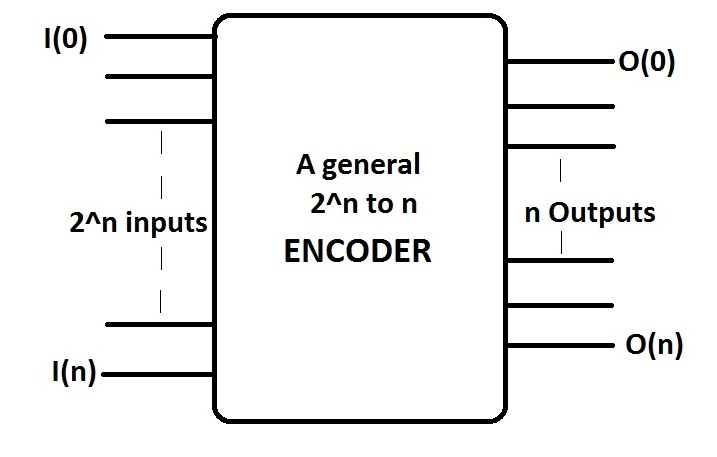
A General encoder's block diagram.

An encoder (or "simple encoder") in digital electronics is a one-hot to binary converter. That is, if there are 2^{n} input lines, and at most only one of them will ever be high, the binary code of this 'hot' line is produced on the n-bit output lines. A binary encoder is the dual of a binary decoder.

If the input circuit can guarantee at most a single-active input, a simple encoder is a better choice than a priority encoder, since it requires less logic to implement. However, a simple encoder can generate an incorrect output when more than a single input is active, so a priority encoder is required in such cases.

== Types of encoder ==
=== 2^{n}-to-n encoders ===
A $2^n$-to-n encoder has n number of outputs in correspondence to the $2^n$ number of inputs. It thus reduces the number of transmission lines and can be compared to a multiplexer. Only one of the inputs become "high" (logic state "1") at a time.

For example, a 4-to-2 simple encoder takes 4 input bits and produces 2 output bits. The illustrated gate level example implements the simple encoder defined by the truth table, but it must be understood that for all the non-explicitly defined input combinations (i.e., inputs containing 0, 2, 3, or 4 high bits) the outputs are treated as don't cares.

==== 4-to-2 encoder ====
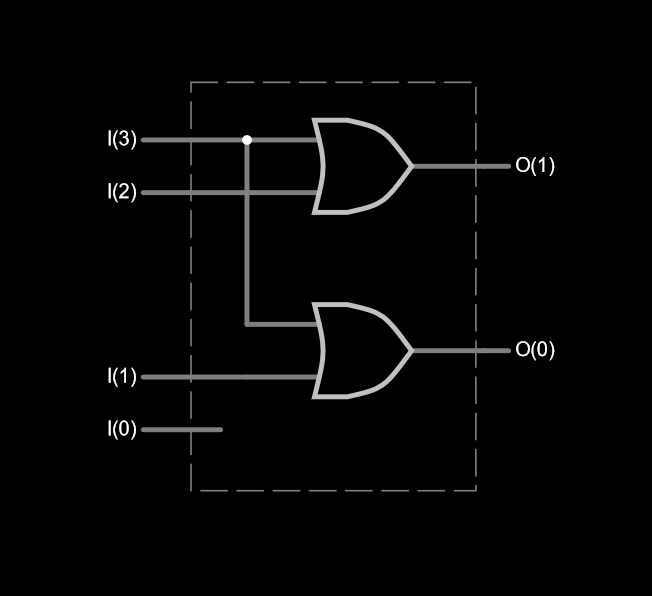
Gate level schematic of a simple 4:2 line encoder

Truth Table
Input				Output	
I_{3}	I_{2}	I_{1}	I_{0}	O_{1}	O_{0}
0	0	0	0	x	
0	0	0	1	0	0
0	0	1	0	0	1
0	1	0	0	1	0
1	0	0	0	1	1

https://en.m.wikipedia.org/wiki/Encoder_(digital)#/editor/4 https://en.m.wikipedia.org/wiki/Encoder_(digital)#/editor/4

== See also ==
- Binary decoder
- Multiplexer (MUX)
- Priority encoder
