= ARM11 =

32-bit ARM core

General information
- Designed by: ARM Holdings

Architecture and classification
- Instruction set: ARM (32-bit), Thumb (16-bit), Thumb-2 (32-bit) (ARMv6, ARMv6T2, ARMv6Z, ARMv6K)

ARM11 is a group of 32-bit RISC ARM processor cores licensed by ARM Holdings. The ARM11 core family consists of ARM1136J(F)-S, ARM1156T2(F)-S, ARM1176JZ(F)-S, and ARM11MPCore. Since ARM11 cores were released from 2002 to 2005, and no longer recommended for new IC designs, newer alternatives are ARM Cortex-A and ARM Cortex-R cores.

== Overview ==
Announced
Year	Core
2002	ARM1136J(F)-S
2003	ARM1156T2(F)-S
2003	ARM1176JZ(F)-S
2005	ARM11MPCore

The ARM11 product family (announced 29 April 2002) introduced the ARMv6 architectural additions which had been announced in October 2001. These include SIMD media instructions, multiprocessor support, exclusive loads and stores instructions and a new cache architecture. The implementation included a significantly improved instruction processing pipeline, compared to previous ARM9 or ARM10 families, and is used in smartphones from Apple, Nokia, and others. The initial ARM11 core (ARM1136) was released to licensees in October 2002.

The ARM11 family are currently the only ARMv6-architecture cores. There are, however, ARMv6-M cores (Cortex-M0 and Cortex-M1), addressing microcontroller applications; ARM11 cores target more demanding applications.

=== Differences from ARM9 ===
In terms of instruction set, ARM11 builds on the preceding ARM9 generation. It incorporates all ARM926EJ-S features and adds the ARMv6 instructions for media support (SIMD) and accelerating IRQ response.

Microarchitecture improvements in ARM11 cores include:

- SIMD instructions which can double MPEG-4 and audio digital signal processing algorithm speed.
- Cache is physically addressed, solving many cache aliasing problems and reducing context switch overhead.
- Unaligned and mixed-endian data access is supported.
- Reduced heat production and lower overheating risk
- Redesigned pipeline, supporting faster clock speeds (target up to 1 GHz)
  - Longer: 8 (vs 5) stages
  - Out-of-order completion for some operations (e.g., stores)
  - Dynamic branch prediction/folding (like XScale)
  - Cache misses don't block execution of non-dependent instructions.
  - Load/store parallelism
  - ALU parallelism
- 64-bit data paths

JTAG debug support (for halting, stepping, breakpoints, and watchpoints) was simplified. The EmbeddedICE module was replaced with an interface which became part of the ARMv7 architecture. The hardware tracing modules (ETM and ETB) are compatible, but updated, versions of those used in the ARM9. In particular, trace semantics were updated to address parallel instruction execution and data transfers.

ARM makes an effort to promote recommended Verilog coding styles and techniques. This ensures semantically rigorous designs, preserving identical semantics throughout the chip design flow, which included extensive use of formal verification techniques. Without such attention, integrating an ARM11 with third-party designs could risk exposing hard-to-find latent bugs. Due to ARM cores being integrated into many different designs, using a variety of logic synthesis tools and chip manufacturing processes, the impact of its register-transfer level (RTL) quality is magnified many times. The ARM11 generation focused more on synthesis than previous generations, making such concerns more of an issue.

== Cores ==
There are four ARM11 cores:

- ARM1136
- ARM1156, introduced Thumb2 instructions
- ARM1176, introduced security extensions
- ARM11MPcore, introduced multicore support

== Chips ==
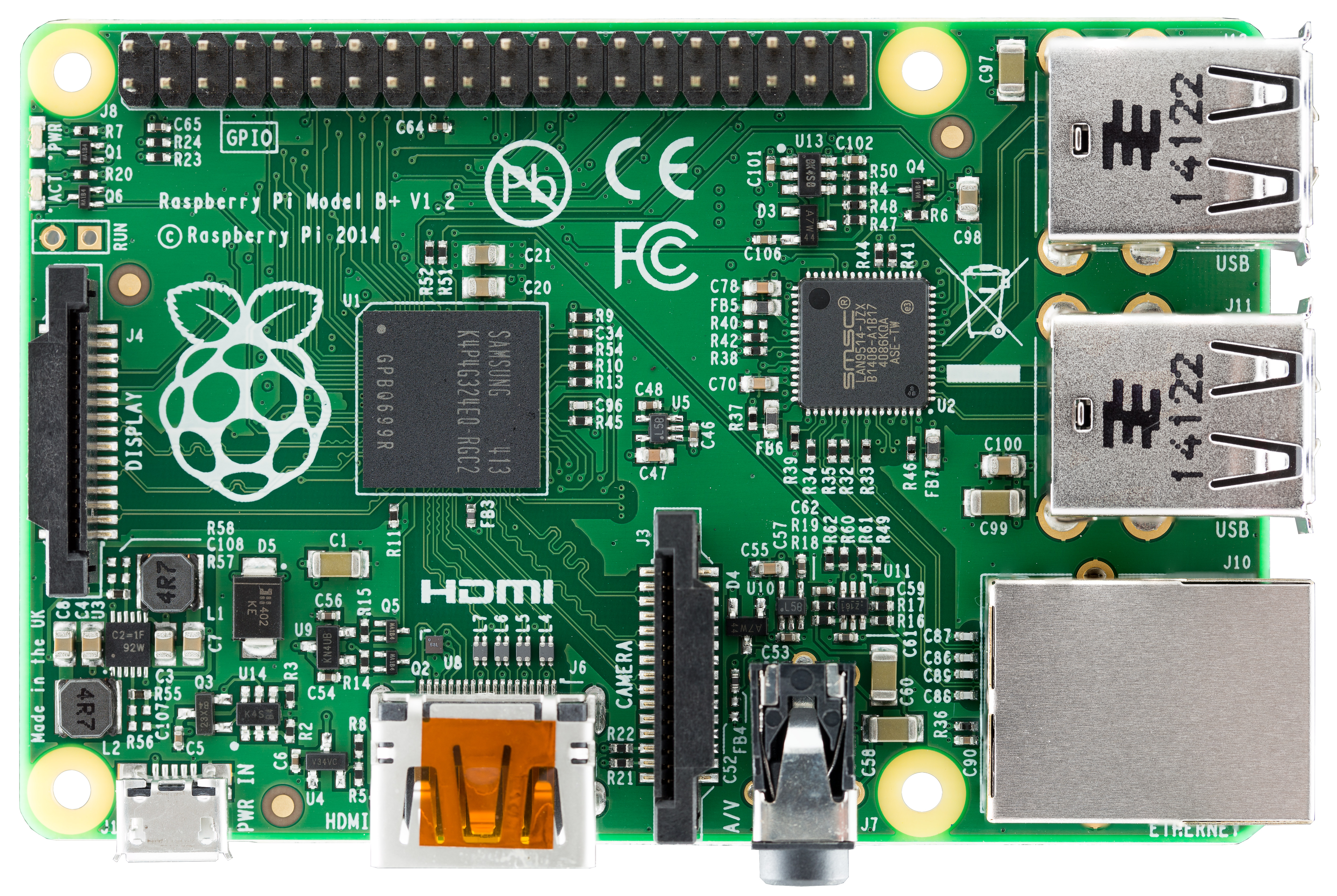
Raspberry Pi B+ with a Broadcom BCM2835 (ARM1176JZF-S)

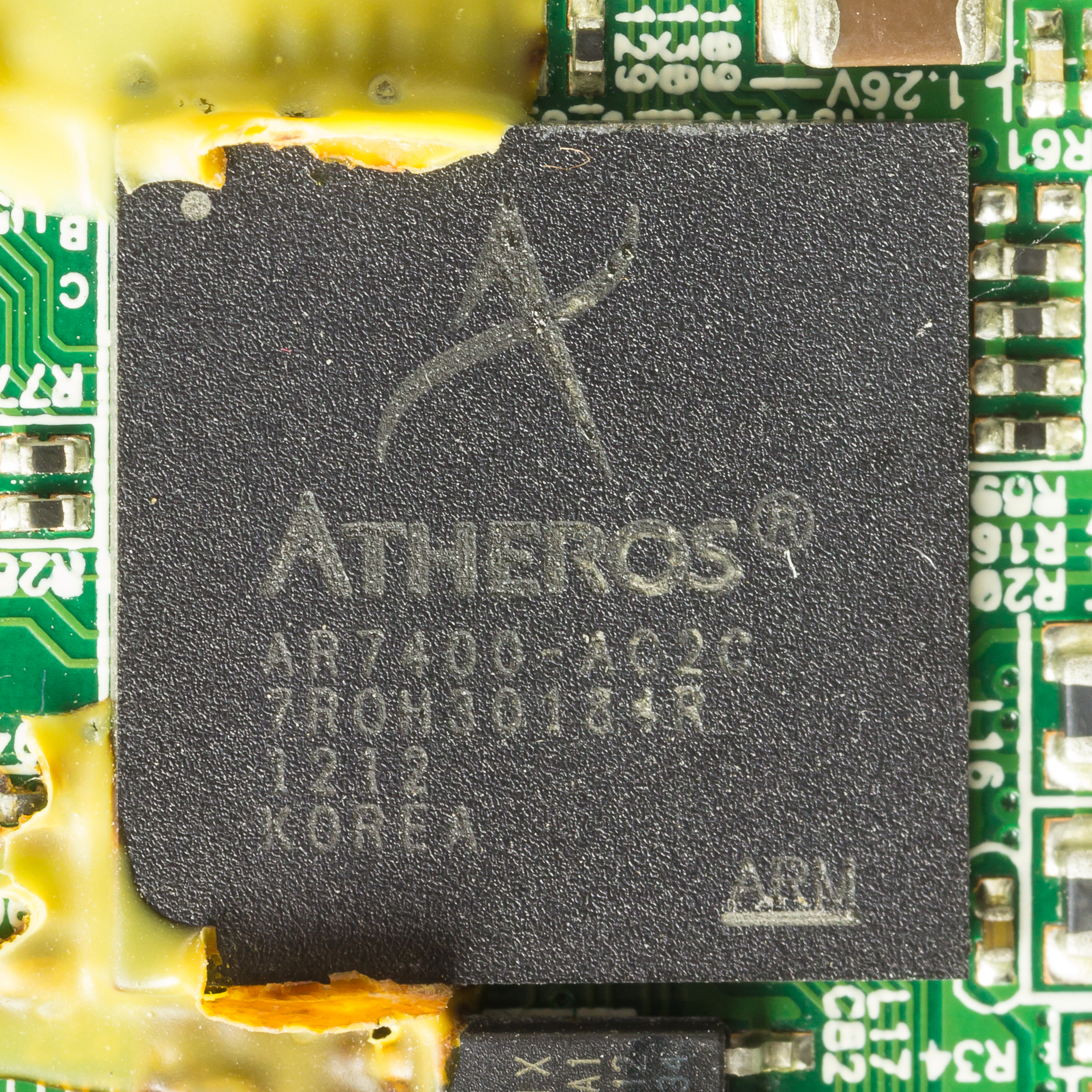
Atheros AR7400

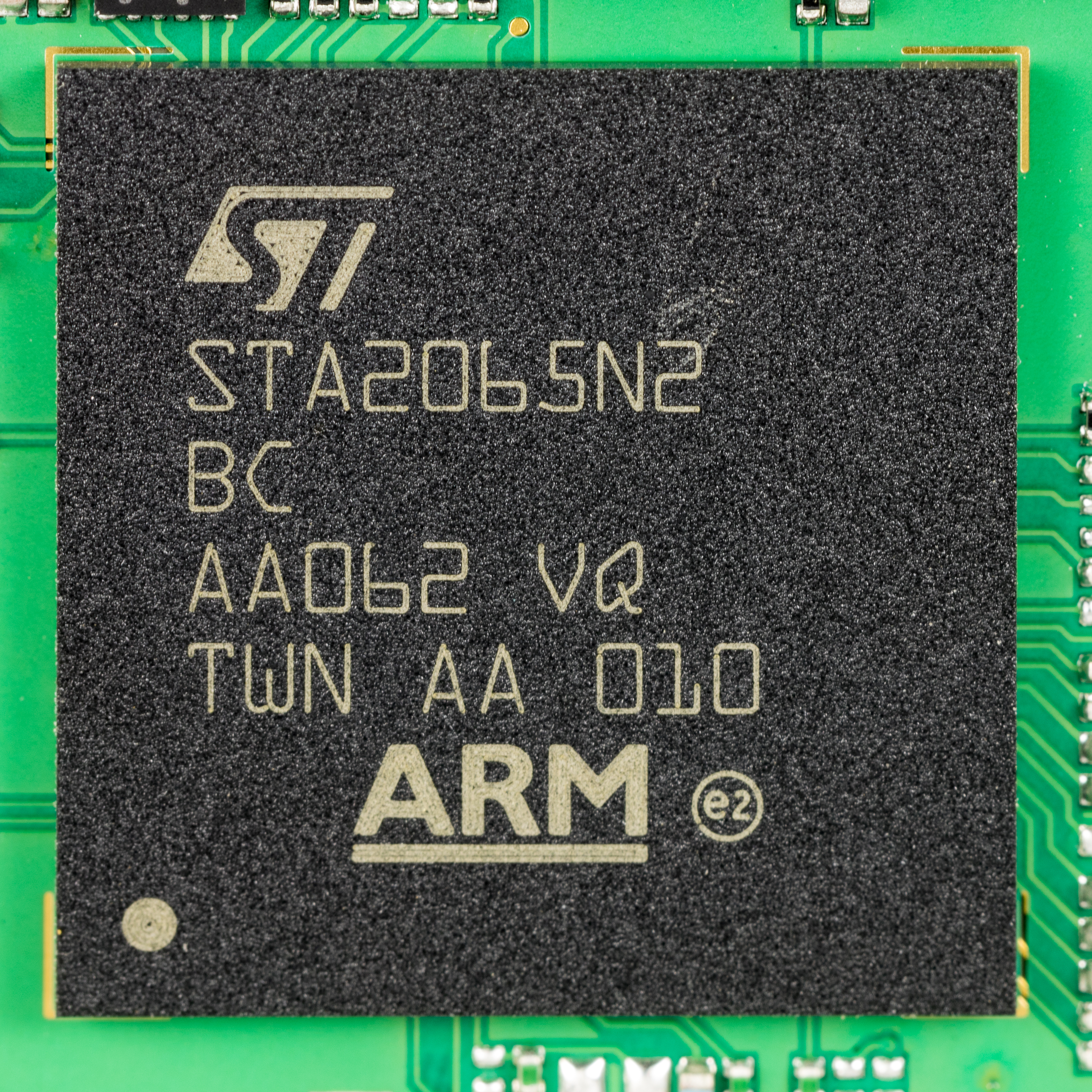
STMicroelectronics STA2065N2 (ARM1176) with embedded GPS

- Ambarella A5s, A7, A7L
- ASPEED Technology Inc. AST25xx
- Broadcom BCM2835 (Raspberry Pi 1 A/B, Pi Zero), BCM21553
- Cavium ECONA CNS3000 series
- CSR Quatro 4230, 45xx, 53xx
- Freescale Semiconductor i.MX3x series, such as i.MX31, i.MX35
- Infotmic IMAPX2xx
- Nintendo CTR-CPU (Nintendo 3DS, New Nintendo 3DS, Nintendo 2DS)
- NTC Module 1879VYa1Ya, K1879KhB1Ya, 1879KhK1Ya, K1888VS018
- Nvidia Tegra
- Nokia RAPIDO YAWE, RAPUYAMA
- MediaTek MT6276, MT6573
- Mindspeed Comcerto 1000 (Freescale LS102MA)
- Philips Semiconductor/NXP/ST-NXP Wireless Nomadik STn8820
- PLX Technology NAS782x
- Qualcomm MSM720x, MSM7x27
- Qualcomm Atheros AR7400
- Samsung S3C64xx, S5P64xx, S5L87xx, S5L89xx or Exynos Dual with Logic11
- Telechips TCC8902
- Texas Instruments OMAP2 series, with a TMS320 C55x or C64x DSP as a second core
- iPhone 3G series, with a Samsung ARM 1176JZ chip
- Xcometic KVM2800

== See also ==
- ARM architecture
- Interrupt, Interrupt handler
- JTAG
- List of ARM architectures and cores
- Real-time operating system, Comparison of real-time operating systems
