= Transmission gate =

CMOS-based electronic switch

A transmission gate (TG) is an analog gate similar to a relay that can conduct in both directions or block by a control signal with almost any voltage potential. It is a CMOS-based switch using a p-channel MOSFET (PMOS) that passes a strong 1 but a poor 0, and a n-channel MOSFET (NMOS) that passes a strong 0 but a poor 1. Both the PMOS and NMOS work simultaneously.

== Structure ==
Principle diagram of a transmission gate. The control input ST must be able to take to control depending on the supply voltage and switching voltage different logic levels.

In principle, a transmission gate is made up of two field-effect transistors (FET), one n-channel MOSFET and one p-channel MOSFET, with their drain and source terminals connected together. Their gate terminals are connected to each other by a NOT gate (inverter), to form the control terminal.

Two variants of the "bow tie" symbol commonly used to represent a transmission gate in circuit diagrams

Unlike with discrete FETs, the substrate terminal is not connected to the source connection. Instead, the substrate terminals are connected to the respective supply potential in order to ensure that the parasitic substrate diode (between source/drain and substrate) is always reversely biased and so does not affect signal flow. The substrate terminal of the p-channel MOSFET is thus connected to the positive supply potential, and the substrate terminal of the n-channel MOSFET connected to the negative supply potential.

== Function ==
Resistance characteristic of a transmission gate. VTHN and VTHP denote those positions at which the voltage to be switched has reached a potential, where the threshold voltage of the respective transistor is reached.

When the control input is a logic zero (negative power supply potential), the gate of the n-channel MOSFET is also at a negative supply voltage potential. The gate terminal of the p-channel MOSFET is caused by the inverter, to the positive supply voltage potential. Regardless of on which switching terminal of the transmission gate (A or B) a voltage is applied (within the permissible range), the gate-source voltage of the n-channel MOSFETs is always negative, and the p-channel MOSFETs is always positive. Accordingly, neither of the two transistors will conduct and the transmission gate turns off.

When the control input is a logic one, the gate terminal of the n-channel MOSFETs is located at a positive supply voltage potential. By the inverter, the gate terminal of the p-channel MOSFETs is now at a negative supply voltage potential. As the substrate terminal of the transistors is not connected to the source terminal, the drain and source terminals are almost equal and the transistors start conducting at a voltage difference between the gate terminal and one of these conducts.

One of the switching terminals of the transmission gate is raised to a voltage near the negative supply voltage, a positive gate-source voltage (gate-to-drain voltage) will occur at the N-channel MOSFET, and the transistor begins to conduct, and the transmission gate conducts. The voltage at one of the switching terminals of the transmission gate is now raised continuously up to the positive supply voltage potential, so the gate-source voltage is reduced (gate-drain voltage) on the n-channel MOSFET, and this begins to turn off. At the same time, the p-channel MOSFET has a negative gate-source voltage (gate-to-drain voltage) builds up, whereby this transistor starts to conduct and the transmission gate switches.

Thereby it is achieved that the transmission gate passes over the entire voltage range. The transition resistance of the transmission gate varies depending upon the voltage to be switched, and corresponds to a superposition of the resistance curves of the two transistors.

== Applications ==
=== Electronic switch ===
Transmission gates are used in order to implement electronic switches and analog multiplexers. If a signal is connected to different outputs (changeover switches, multiplexers), multiple transmission gates can be used as a transmission gate to either conduct or block (simple switch). A typical example in 4000-series and 74-series called the 4066 4-way "bilateral switch" can handle analog or digital signals and is available from various manufacturers.

=== Analog multiplexer ===
Many mixed-signal systems use an analog multiplexer to route several analog input channels to a single analog-to-digital converter.

=== Logic circuits ===
Logic circuits can be constructed with the aid of transmission gates instead of traditional CMOS pull-up and pull-down networks. Such circuits can often be made more compact, which can be an important consideration in silicon implementations.

=== Negative voltages ===
By using a transmission gate to switch alternating voltages (e.g.: audio signal), the negative power supply potential must be lower than the lowest signal potential. This ensures that the substrate diode will remain non-conducting even at negative voltages. Although the transmission gate can still switch to logic voltage levels, there are special versions with integrated level shifters. A good example, is the 4053 standard chip, commonly used to select between analogue inputs to an audio amplifier, has a separate ground (pin 8) and negative substrate connection (pin 7) that also supplies the level shifter.

== See also ==
- Tri-state logic
- Analogue switch
