= Vybrid Series =

The Vybrid Series is a low power System on chip from Freescale Semiconductor with ARM Cortex-A5 and optional Cortex-M4 cores. VF6xx comes with asymmetrical multiprocessing using both cores. Alternatives such as the VF5xx and VF3xx only support the ARM Cortex-A5. The ARM Cortex-A5 cores run from 266 MHz to 500 MHz depending on package options and ARM Cortex-M4 Cores at 168 MHz if present.
