= NeuroMatrix =

NeuroMatrix is a digital signal processor (DSP) series developed by NTC Module. The DSP has a VLIW/SIMD architecture. It consists of a 32-bit RISC core and a 64-bit vector co-processor. The vector co-processor supports vector operations with elements of variable bit length (US Pat. 6539368 B1) and is optimized to support the implementation of artificial neural networks. From this derives the name NeuroMatrix Core (NMC). Newer devices contain multiple DSP cores and additional ARM or PowerPC 470 cores.

== Overview ==
Designation		DSP cores	Microprocessor cores	Production start (year)	Process (nm)	Clock rate (MHz)	Remarks
Russian	English	DSP cores	Microprocessor cores	Production start (year)	Process (nm)	Clock rate (MHz)	Remarks
L1879VM1	nm6403	1× NMC	—	1999	500	40	
1879VM2	nm6404	1× NMC2	—	2005	250	80	
1879VM3	DSM	?	—	2002 ?	250	150	
1879VM4	nm6405	1× NMC3	—	2009	?	150	
1879VM5Ya	nm6406	1× NMC3	—	2013	90	320	
1879VM6Ya	nm6407	2× NMC4	—	2016	65	500	
1879VM8Ya	nm6408	16× NMC4	5× ARM Cortex-A5	2019	28	800	
1879VYa1Ya		2× NMC3	1× ARM1176JZF-S	2013	90	328	
K1879KhB1Ya		1× NMC3	1× ARM1176JZF-S	2011	90	324	
1879KhK1Ya		2× NMC3	1× ARM1176JZF-S	2010	90	81.92	
K1888VS018		2× NMC3	1× ARM1176JZF-S	2016	65	320	
1888VS048			1× ARM Cortex-A5	2019 ?	28	600	
1888VS058		2× NMC3	1x ARM Cortex-A5	2020 ?	?	512	
1888TKh018		4× NMC3	2× PowerPC 470	2019	28	400	
1888VM018			PowerPC 470	2020 ?	?	200	rad-hard

== Details ==
=== L1879VM1 ===
- Russian: Л1879ВМ1
- start of development in 1996, start of production in 1999 at Samsung

=== 1879VM2 ===
- Russian: 1879ВМ2
- manufactured at Fujitsu

=== 1879VM3 ===
- Russian: 1879ВМ3
- manufactured at Fujitsu

=== 1879VM5Ya ===
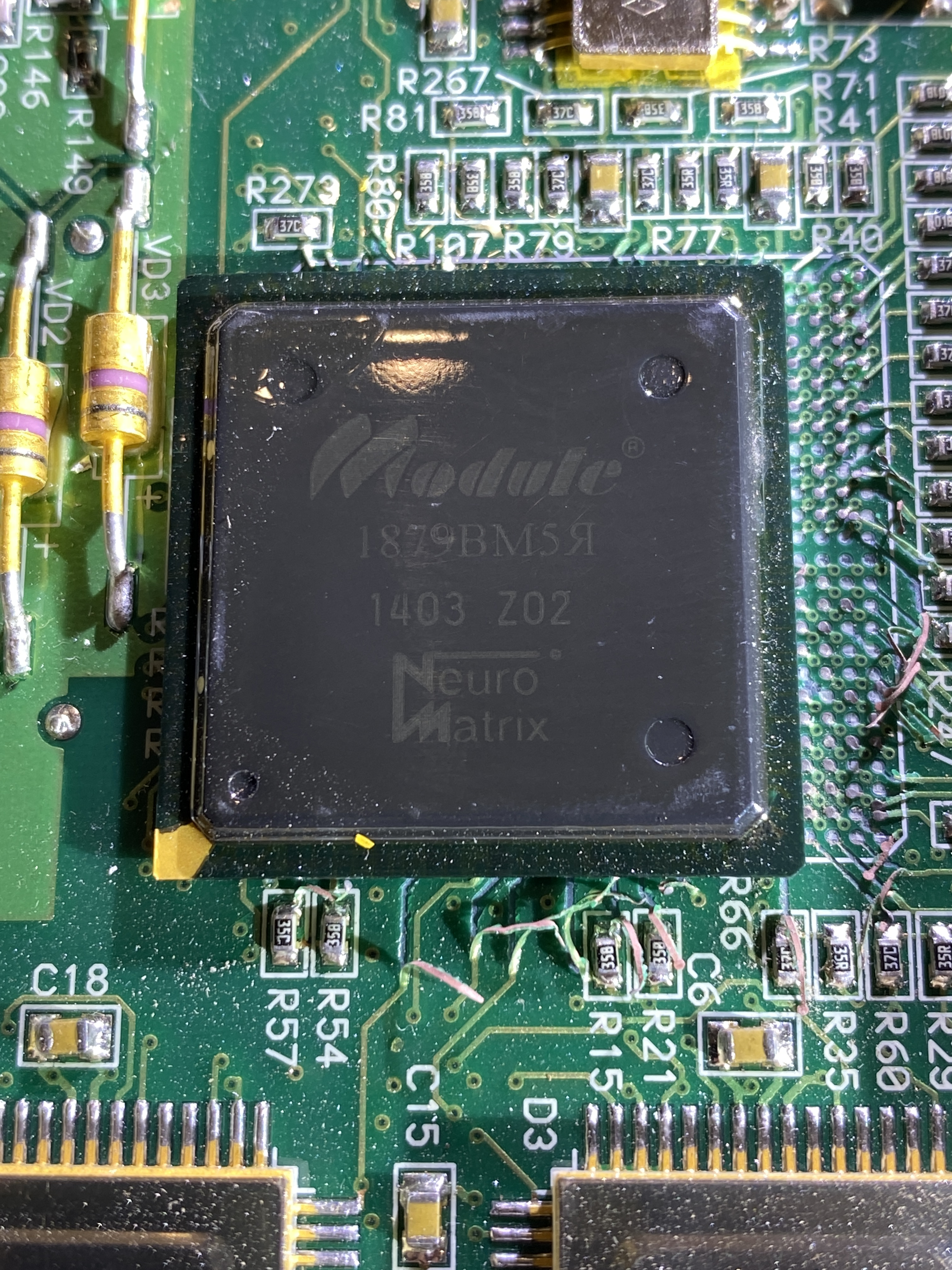
Microprocessor 1879VM5Ya

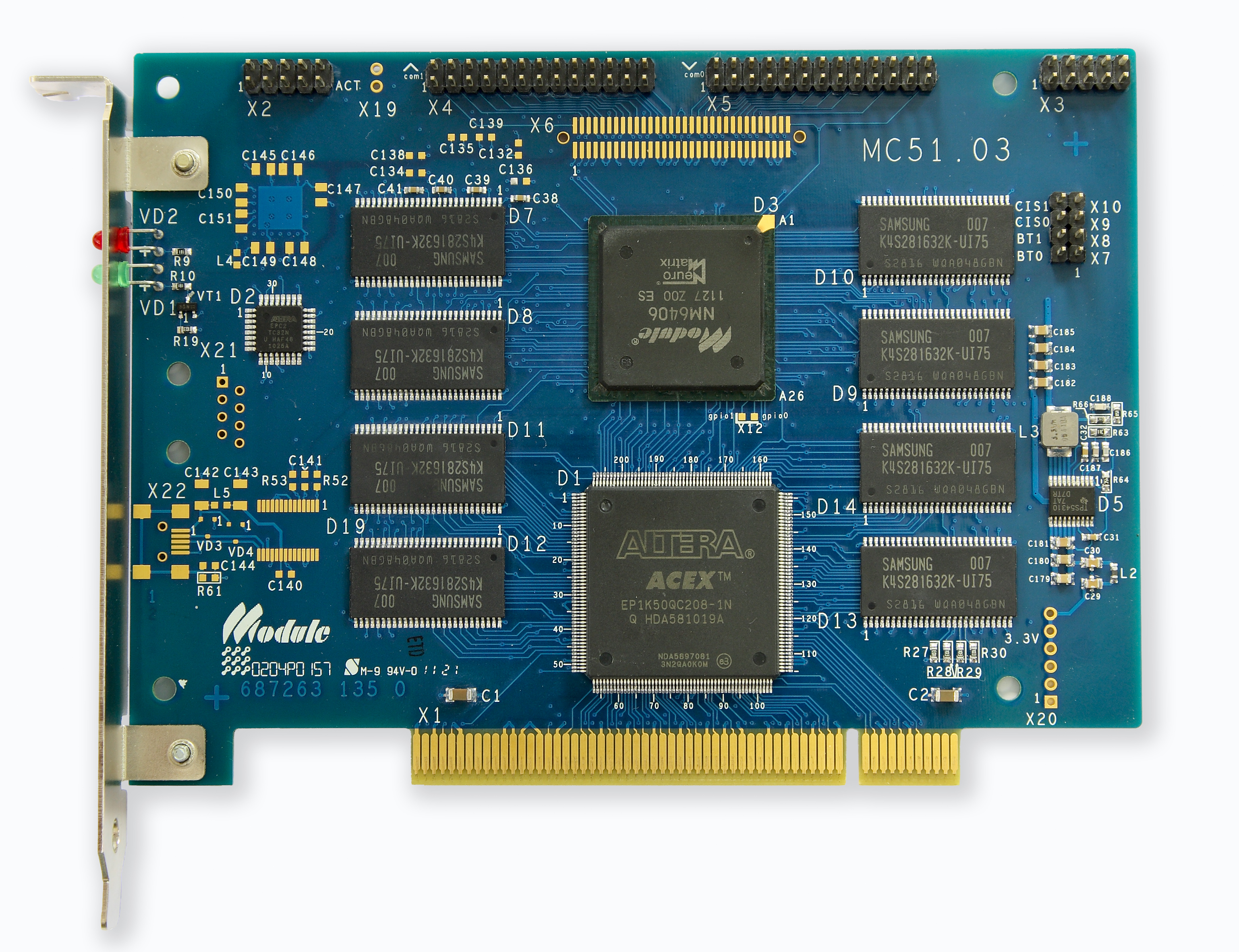
Evaluation board MC51.03 for the NM6406 / 1879VM5Ya processor

- Russian: 1879ВМ5Я
- manufactured at Fujitsu Japan

=== 1879VM6Ya ===
- Russian: 1879ВМ6Я
- manufactured at GlobalFoundries Malaysia

=== 1879VM8Ya ===
- Russian: 1879ВМ8Я
- system-on-a-chip (SoC) containing 4 computing clusters, each consisting of one ARM Cortex-A5 core and four NMC4 DSP cores, plus one stand-alone ARM Cortex-A5 core
- manufactured at TSMC ?

=== 1879VYa1Ya ===
- Russian: 1879ВЯ1Я
- system-on-a-chip (SoC) for software-defined radios, including four 12-bit analog-to-digital converters with 82MSamples/s and hardware blocks implementing a digital direct-conversion receiver

=== K1879KhB1Ya ===
- Russian: К1879ХБ1Я, also romanized as K1879XB1Ya
- manufactured at Fujitsu
- system-on-a-chip (SoC) for set-top boxes where the NMC core is used as an audio processor

=== 1879KhK1Ya ===
- Russian: 1879ХК1Я, also romanized as 1879XK1Ya
- system-on-a-chip (SoC) for software-defined radios, including four 12-bit analog-to-digital converters with 85MSamples/s and hardware blocks implementing a digital direct-conversion receiver

=== K1888VS018 ===
- Russian: К1888ВС018
- system-on-a-chip (SoC) for software-defined radios, including four 10-bit analog-to-digital converters with 90MSamples/s, as well as CAN bus, I²C, SPI, Ethernet

=== 1888VS048 ===
- Russian: К1888ВС048
- system-on-a-chip (SoC) for connecting a PCI Express 2.0 host interface to 4x Gigabit Ethernet (with RFC 4175 support), ARINC 429, as well as CAN bus, I²C, SPI

=== 1888VS058 ===
- Russian: К1888ВС058
- system-on-a-chip (SoC) for radar systems with dedicated interfaces for high-speed analog-to-digital converters and digital-to-analog converters

=== 1888TKh018 ===
- Russian: 1888ТХ018
- system-on-a-chip (SoC) for aircraft onboard video and multimedia processing systems, including ARINC 818 and SpaceWire interfaces as well as hardware encoder and decoder for H.264 video

=== 1888VM018 ===
- Russian: 1888ВМ018
- rad-hard system-on-a-chip (SoC) including SpaceWire, Ethernet, SPI, SDIO interfaces
