= 6264 =

Static RAM integrated circuit

Pinout of the 6264 SRAM IC

The 6264 is a JEDEC-standard static RAM integrated circuit. It has a capacity of 64 Kbit (8 KB). It is produced by a wide variety of different vendors, including Hitachi, Hynix, and Cypress Semiconductor. It is available in a variety of different configurations, such as DIP, SPDIP, and SOIC. Some versions of the 6264 can run in ultra-low-power mode and retain memory when not in use, thus making them suitable for battery backup applications.

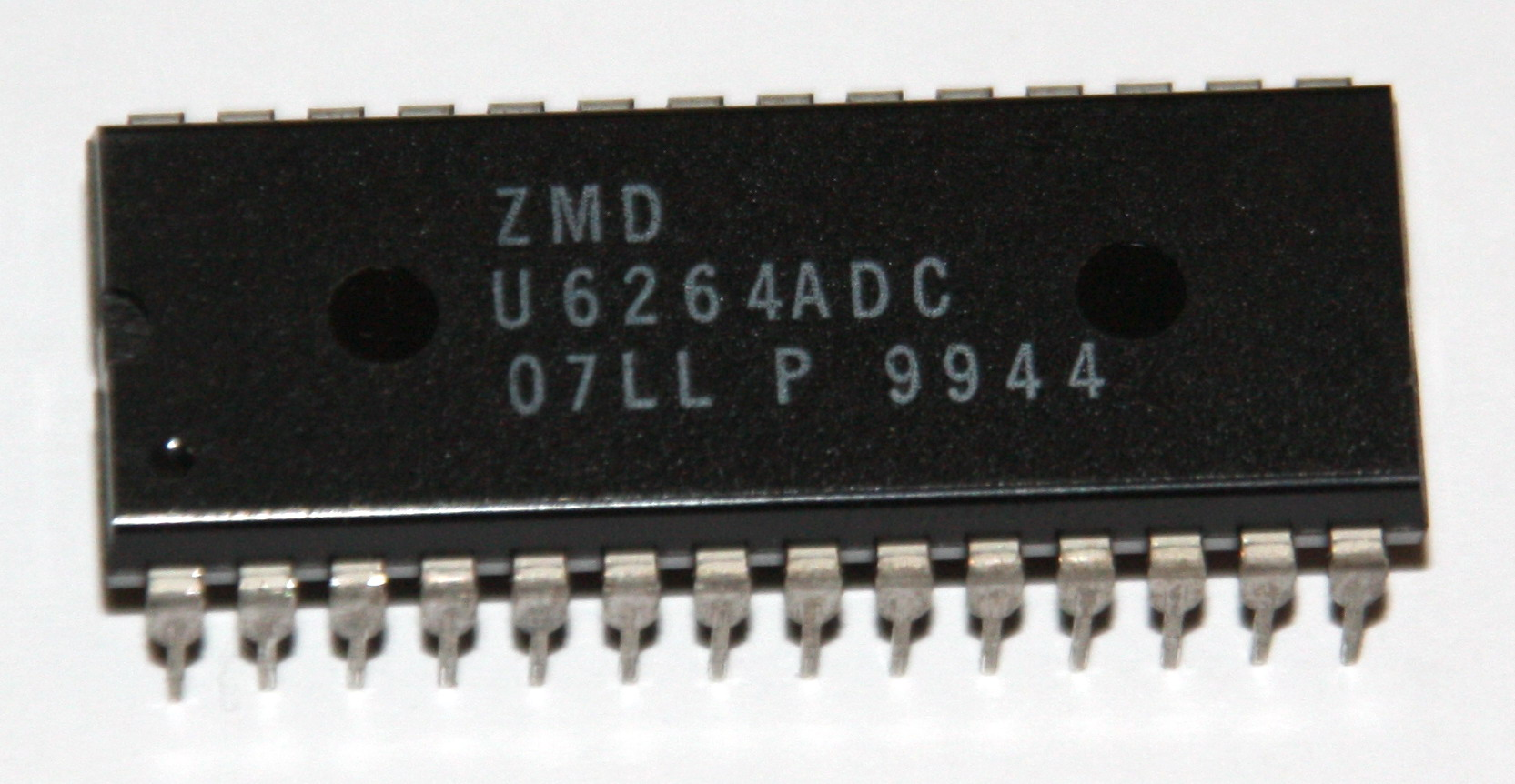
ZMD U6264 SRAM
