= Dinero =

Dinero is the Spanish word for money.

Dinero may refer to:

- Spanish dinero, Spanish (and empire) currency during medieval and early modern period
- Dinero (cache simulator), a trace-driven uniprocessor cache simulator
- "Dinero" (Jennifer Lopez song), released in 2018
- Dinero (magazine), a Colombian financial magazine
- "Dinero" (Trinidad Cardona song), released in 2017
- "Dinero", a song by Bad Gyal from Slow Wine Mixtape
- Dinero, Texas, an unincorporated community in eastern Live Oak County, Texas
- Monte Dinero, a town in Patagonia, Santa Cruz Province, Argentina
