= Oryon =

CPU model

Oryon is a series of custom CPU cores implementing the ARM architecture featuring a microarchitecture designed by Qualcomm. It is used on the Snapdragon X series, Snapdragon Ride Elite, Snapdragon Cockpit Elite, and Snapdragon 8 systems on chips, first released in June 2024.

It began development in 2021 when NuVia Inc. was acquired by Qualcomm. It is the first custom microarchitecture for smartphone SoCs released by Qualcomm since the original Kryo.

== Models ==
=== 1st generation ===
Development of the first generation of Oryon started in 2021 under Nuvia. This generation consists of Snapdragon X-series chips that are targeted at laptops. They implement the ARMv8.7-A instruction set.

Comparison of 1st generation Oryon CPUs
Branding	Model number	Core count	Total cache	Max multithread frequency	Boost frequency	Memory type	Release
X Elite	X1E-00-1DE	12	42 MB	3.8 GHz	4.3 GHz (dual-core)	LPDDR5x-8448	Q2 2024
X Elite	X1E-84-100	12	42 MB	3.8 GHz	4.2 GHz (dual-core)	LPDDR5x-8448	Q2 2024
X Elite	X1E-80-100	12	42 MB	3.4 GHz	4.0 GHz (dual-core)	LPDDR5x-8448	Q2 2024
X Elite	X1E-78-100	12	42 MB	3.4 GHz	–	LPDDR5x-8448	Q2 2024
X Plus	X1P-66-100	10	42 MB	3.4 GHz	4.0 GHz (single-core)	LPDDR5x-8448	Q2 2024
X Plus	X1P-64-100	10	42 MB	3.4 GHz	–	LPDDR5x-8448	Q2 2024
X Plus	X1P-46-100	8	30 MB	3.4 GHz	4.0 GHz (single-core)	LPDDR5x-8448	Q2 2024
X Plus	X1P-42-100	8	30 MB	3.2 GHz	3.4 GHz (single-core)	LPDDR5x-8448	Q2 2024
X	X1-26-100	8	30 MB	3.0 GHz	-	LPDDR5x-8448	Q1 2025

=== 2nd generation ===
The second generation consists only of Snapdragon 8-series chips targeted at smartphones and tablets. They implement the ARMv8.7-A instruction set.

Comparison of 2nd generation Oryon CPUs
Branding	Model number	Core count	Total cache	Max multithread frequency	Boost frequency	Memory type	Release
8 Elite for Galaxy	SM8750-AC	2 + 6	32MB (24-L2; 8-SLC)	3.53GHz	4.47GHz (dual-core)	LPDDR5x-10600	Q1 2025
8 Elite	SM8750-AB	2 + 6	32MB (24-L2; 8-SLC)	3.5GHz	4.32GHz (dual-core)	LPDDR5x-10600	Q4 2024
8 Elite	SM8750-3-AB	2 + 5	32MB (24-L2; 8-SLC)	3.5GHz	4.32GHz (dual-core)	LPDDR5x-10600	Q1 2025

=== 3rd generation ===
The 3rd generation is the first to include both 8 and X series chips. They implement the ARMv9.3-A instruction set.

Comparison of 3rd generation Oryon CPUs
Branding	Model number	Core count		Total cache	Max multithread frequency		Boost frequency		Memory type	Release
Branding	Model number	Prime	Performance	Total cache	Prime	Performance	Prime	Performance	Memory type	Release
X2 Elite Extreme	X2E-96-100	12	6	53 MB	4.4 GHz	3.6 Ghz	5.0 GHz	—N/a	LPDDR5x-9523	Q1 2026
X2 Elite Extreme	X2E-94-100	12	6	53 MB	4.4 GHz	3.6 Ghz	4.7 GHz	—N/a	LPDDR5x-9523	Q1 2026
X2 Elite Extreme	X2E-90-100	12	6	53 MB	4.4 GHz	3.6 Ghz	5.0 GHz	—N/a	LPDDR5x-9523	Q1 2026
X2 Elite	X2E-88-100	12	6	53 MB	4.0 GHz	3.4 Ghz	4.7 GHz	—N/a	LPDDR5x-9523	Q1 2026
X2 Elite	X2E-84-100	6	6	34 MB	4.0 GHz	3.4 Ghz	4.7 GHz	—N/a	LPDDR5x-9523	Q1 2026
X2 Elite	X2E-80-100	6	6	34 MB	4.0 GHz	3.4 Ghz	4.7 GHz	—N/a	LPDDR5x-9523	Q1 2026
X2 Elite	X2E-78-100	6	6	34 MB	4.0 GHz	3.4 Ghz	4.7 GHz	—N/a	LPDDR5x-9523	Q1 2026
X2 Plus	X2P-64-100	10	—N/a	34 MB	4.04 GHz	—N/a	—N/a	—N/a	LPDDR5x-9523	Q1 2026
X2 Plus	X2P-42-100	6	—N/a	22 MB	4.04 GHz	—N/a	—N/a	—N/a	LPDDR5x-9523	Q1 2026
8 Elite Gen 5 for Galaxy	SM8850-1-AD	2	6		4.74 GHz	3.63 GHz			LPDDR5x-10600	Q1 2026
8 Elite Gen 5	SM8850-5-AC	2	6		4.61 GHz	3.63 GHz			LPDDR5x-10600	Q1 2026
8 Elite Gen 5	SM8850-AC	2	5		4.61 GHz	3.63 GHz			LPDDR5x-10600	Q3 2025
8 Elite Gen 5 V	SM8850-1-AB	2	6		4.61 GHz	3.63 GHz			LPDDR5x-10600	Q3 2026
8 Gen 5	SM8845	2	6		3.8 GHz	3.32 GHz			LPDDR5x-9600	Q4 2025

=== 4th generation ===
The 4th generation was announced in 2026.

Comparison of 4th generation Oryon CPUs
Branding	Model number	Core count		Total cache	Max multithread frequency		Boost frequency		Memory type	Release
Branding	Model number	Prime	Performance	Total cache	Prime	Performance	Prime	Performance	Memory type	Release
8 Elite Extreme Gen 6		2	6		5.0 GHz	4.0 GHz			LPDDR6-10600	Q3 2026
8 Elite Gen 6		2	6		5.0 GHz	4.0 GHz			LPDDR6-10600	Q3 2026
