= Dinero (cache simulator) =

Dinero is a uniprocessor CPU cache simulator for memory reference traces written by Dr. Jan Edler and Prof. Mark D. Hill of the University of Wisconsin–Madison. It is frequently used for educational purposes. Dinero is freely available for non-commercial use.

== See also ==
- Central processing unit (CPU)
- CPU cache
