= Monte Dinero =

Town in Santa Cruz Province, Argentina

Coordinates: 52°21′S 68°21′W

Monte Dinero (literally, "Mount Money") is a town on the southeastern tip of Patagonia, in Santa Cruz Province, Argentina. It is located near the Strait of Magellan, 120 km (75 mi) southeast of Rio Gallegos. Most of the land around Monte Dinero is devoted to sheep and cattle ranching.
