= List of electronic component packaging types =

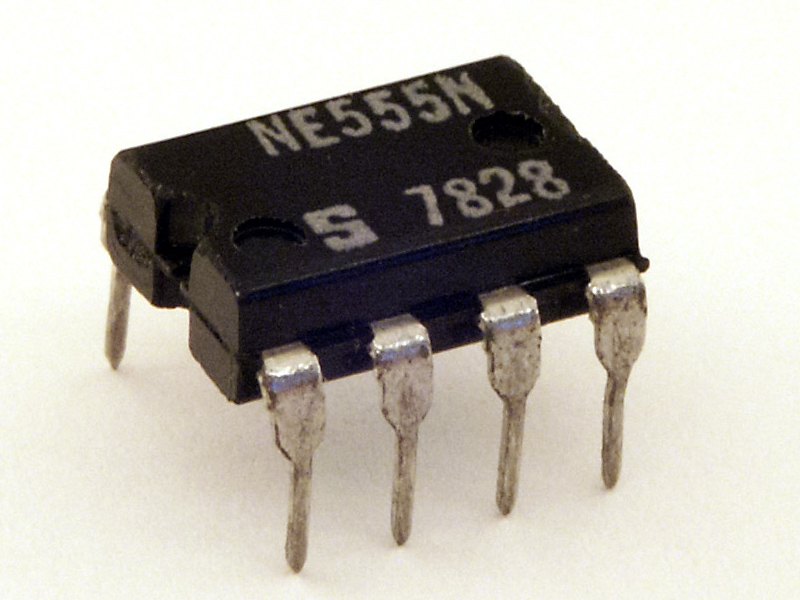
A standard-sized 8-pin dual in-line package (DIP) containing a 555 IC.

Integrated circuits and certain other electronic components are put into protective packages to allow easy handling and assembly onto printed circuit boards and to protect the devices from damage. A very large number of package types exist. Some package types have standardized dimensions and tolerances, and are registered with trade industry associations such as JEDEC and Pro Electron. Other types are proprietary designations that may be made by only one or two manufacturers. Integrated circuit packaging is the last assembly process before testing and shipping devices to customers.

Occasionally specially-processed integrated circuit dies are prepared for direct connections to a substrate without an intermediate header or carrier. In flip chip systems the IC is connected by solder bumps to a substrate. In beam-lead technology, the metallized pads that would be used for wire bonding connections in a conventional chip are thickened and extended to allow external connections to the circuit. Assemblies using "bare" chips have additional packaging or filling with epoxy to protect the devices from moisture.

== Through-hole packages ==
Through-hole technology uses holes drilled through the printed circuit board (PCB) for mounting the components. The component has leads that are soldered to pads on the PCB to electrically and mechanically connect them to the PCB.

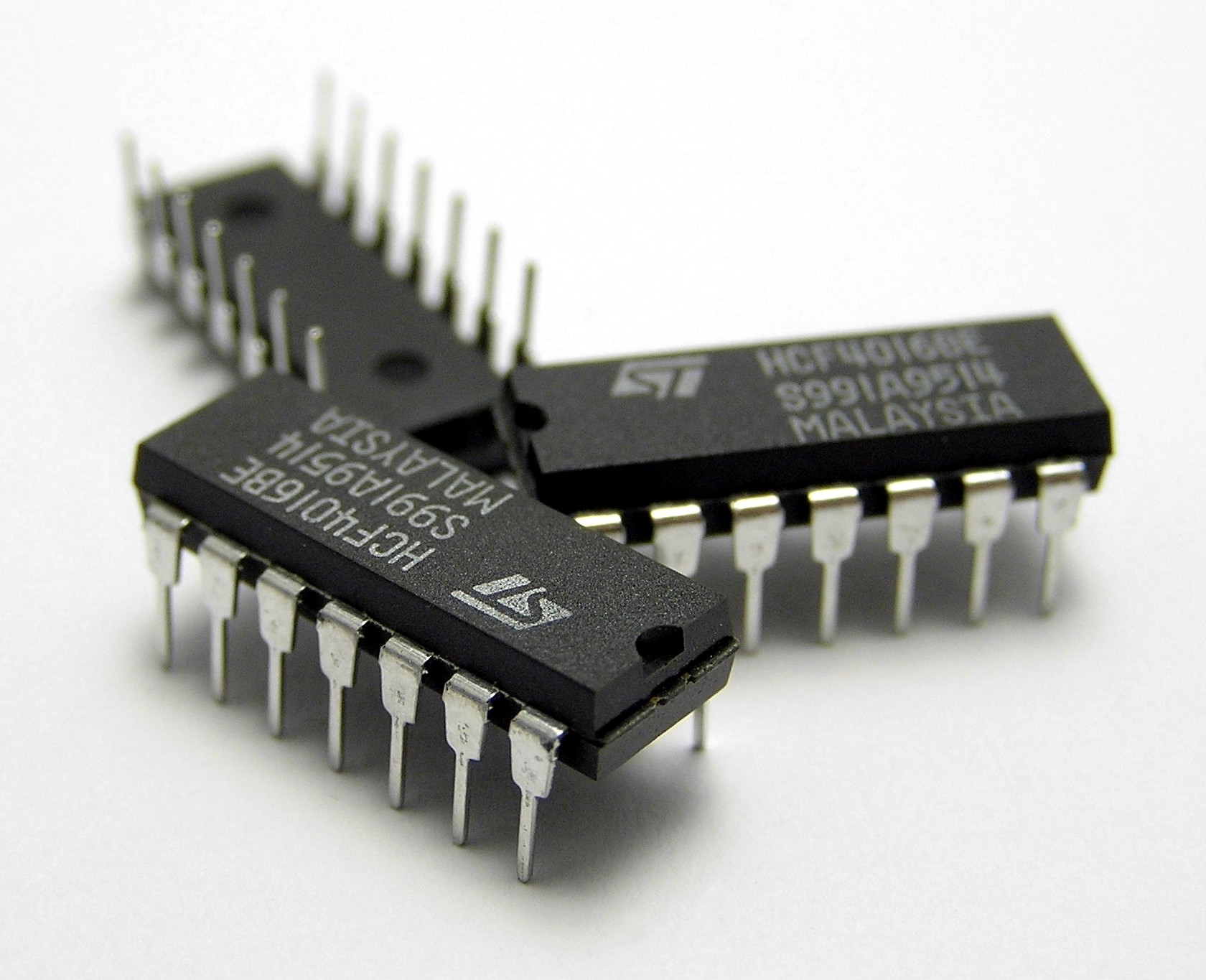
Three 14-pin (DIP14) plastic dual in-line packages containing IC chips.

Acronym	Full name	Remark
SIP	Single in-line package	
DIP	Dual in-line package	0.1 in (2.54 mm) pin spacing, rows 0.3 in (7.62 mm) or 0.6 in (15.24 mm) apart. Other row spacings are used much less frequently, like 0.4 in (10.2 mm) and 0.9 in (22.9 mm).
CDIP	Ceramic DIP	
CERDIP	Glass-sealed ceramic DIP	
QIP	Quad in-line package	Like DIP but with staggered (zig-zag) pins.
SKDIP	Skinny DIP	Standard DIP with 0.1 in (2.54 mm) pin spacing, rows 0.3 in (7.62 mm) apart.
SDIP	Shrink DIP	Non-standard DIP with smaller 0.07 in (1.78 mm) pin spacing.
ZIP	Zig-zag in-line package	
MDIP	Molded DIP	
PDIP	Plastic DIP	

== Surface mount ==
Acronym	Full name	Remark
CCGA	Ceramic column-grid array (CGA)	
CGA	Column-grid array	
CERPACK	Ceramic package	
CQGP	Ceramic Quad Grid Array Package	
LLP	Lead-less lead-frame package	A package with metric pin distribution (0.5–0.8 mm pitch)
LGA	Land grid array	
LTCC	Low-temperature co-fired ceramic	
MCM	Multi-chip module	
MICRO SMDXT	Micro surface-mount device extended technology	

Chip on board is a packaging technique that directly connects a die to a PCB, without an interposer or lead frame.

== Chip carrier ==
A chip carrier is a rectangular package with contacts on all four edges. Leaded chip carriers have metal leads wrapped around the edge of the package, in the shape of a letter J. Leadless chip carriers have metal pads on the edges. Chip carrier packages may be made of ceramic or plastic and are usually secured to a printed circuit board by soldering, though sockets can be used for testing.

Acronym	Full name	Remark
BCC	Bump chip carrier	
CLCC	Ceramic lead-less chip carrier	
LCC	Lead-less chip carrier	Contacts are recessed vertically.
LCC	Leaded chip carrier	
LCCC	Leaded ceramic-chip carrier	
DLCC	Dual lead-less chip carrier (ceramic)	
PLCC	Plastic leaded chip carrier	

== Pin grid arrays ==
Acronym	Full name	Remark
OPGA	Organic pin-grid array	
FCPGA	Flip-chip pin-grid array	
PGA	Pin-grid array	Also known as PPGA
CPGA	Ceramic pin-grid array	

== Flat packages ==
Acronym	Full name	Remark
–	Flat-pack	Earliest version metal/ceramic packaging with flat leads
CFP	Ceramic flat-pack	
CQFP	Ceramic quad flat-pack	Similar to PQFP
BQFP	Bumpered quad flat-pack	
DFN	Dual flat-pack	No lead
ETQFP	Exposed thin quad flat-package	
PQFN	Power quad flat-pack	No-leads, with exposed die-pad[s] for heatsinking
PQFP	Plastic quad flat-package	
LQFP	Low-profile quad flat-package	
QFN	Quad flat no-leads package	Also called as micro lead frame (MLF).
QFP	Quad flat package	
MQFP	Metric quad flat-pack	QFP with metric pin distribution
HVQFN	Heat-sink very-thin quad flat-pack, no-leads	
SIDEBRAZE		
TQFP	Thin quad flat-pack	
VQFP	Very-thin quad flat-pack	
TQFN	Thin quad flat, no-lead	
VQFN	Very-thin quad flat, no-lead	
WQFN	Very-very-thin quad flat, no-lead	
UQFN	Ultra-thin quad flat-pack, no-lead	
ODFN	Optical dual flat, no-lead	IC packaged in transparent packaging used in optical sensor

== Small outline packages ==
A small outline integrated circuit (SOIC) is a surface-mounted integrated circuit (IC) package which occupies an area about 30–50% less than an equivalent dual in-line package (DIP), with a typical thickness being 70% less. They are generally available in the same pin-outs as their counterpart DIP ICs.

Acronym	Full name	Remark
SOP	Small-outline package	
CSOP	Ceramic small-outline package	
DSOP	Dual small-outline package	
HSOP	Thermally-enhanced small-outline package	
HSSOP	Thermally-enhanced shrink small-outline package	
HTSSOP	Thermally-enhanced thin shrink small-outline package	
mini-SOIC	Mini small-outline integrated circuit	
MSOP	Mini small-outline package	Maxim uses the trademarked name μMAX for MSOP packages
PSOP	Plastic small-outline package	
PSON	Plastic small-outline no-lead package	
QSOP	Quarter-size small-outline package	The terminal pitch is 0.635 mm.
SOIC	Small-outline integrated circuit	Also known as SOIC NARROW and SOIC WIDE
SOJ	Small-outline J-leaded package	
SON	Small-outline no-lead package	
SSOP	Shrink small-outline package	
TSOP	Thin small-outline package	
TSSOP	Thin shrink small-outline package	
TVSOP	Thin very-small-outline package	
VSOP	Very-small-outline package	
VSSOP	Very-thin shrink small-outline package	Also referred as MSOP = micro small-outline package
WSON	Very-very-thin small-outline no-lead package	
USON	Very-very-thin small-outline no-lead package	Slightly smaller than WSON

== Chip-scale packages ==
According to IPC's standard J-STD-012, Implementation of Flip Chip and Chip Scale Technology, in order to qualify as chip scale, the package must have an area no greater than 1.2 times that of the die and it must be a single-die, direct surface mountable package. Another criterion that is often applied to qualify these packages as CSPs is their ball pitch should be no more than 1 mm.

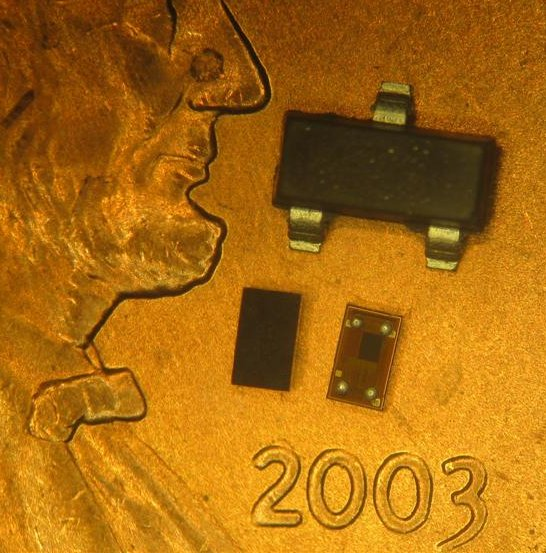
Example WL-CSP devices sitting on the face of a U.S. penny. A SOT-23 device is shown (top) for comparison.

Acronym	Full name	Remark
BL	Beam lead technology	Bare silicon chip, an early chip-scale package
CSP	Chip-scale package	Package size is no more than 1.2× the size of the silicon chip
TCSP	True chip-size package	Package is same size as silicon
TDSP	True die-size package	Same as TCSP
WCSP or WL-CSP or WLCSP	Wafer-level chip-scale package	A WL-CSP or WLCSP package is just a bare die with a redistribution layer (or I/O pitch) to rearrange the pins or contacts on the die so that they can be big enough and have sufficient spacing so that they can be handled just like a BGA package.
PMCP	Power mount CSP (chip-scale package)	Variation of WLCSP, for power devices like MOSFETs. Made by Panasonic.
Fan-out WLCSP	Fan-out wafer-level packaging	Variation of WLCSP. Like a BGA package but with the interposer built directly atop the die and encapsulated alongside it.
eWLB	Embedded wafer level ball grid array	Variation of WLCSP.
MICRO SMD	-	Chip-size package (CSP) developed by National Semiconductor
COB	Chip on board	Bare die supplied without a package. It is mounted directly to the PCB using bonding wires and covered with a blob of black Epoxy. Also used for LEDs. In LEDs, transparent epoxy or a silicon caulk-like material that may contain a phosphor is poured into a mold containing the LED(s) and cured. The mold forms part of the package.
COF	Chip-on-flex	Variation of COB, where a chip is mounted directly to a flex circuit. Unlike COB, it may not use wires nor be covered with epoxy, using underfill instead.
TAB	Tape-automated bonding	Variation of COF, where a flip chip is mounted directly to a flex circuit without the use of bonding wires. Used by LCD driver ICs.
COG	Chip-on-glass	Variation of TAB, where a chip is mounted directly to a piece of glass - typically an LCD. Used by LCD and OLED driver ICs.

== Ball grid array ==
Ball grid array (BGA) uses the underside of the package to place pads with balls of solder in grid pattern as connections to PCB.

Acronym	Full name	Remark
FBGA	Fine-pitch ball-grid array	A square or rectangular array of solder balls on one surface
LBGA	Low-profile ball-grid array	Also known as laminate ball-grid array
TEPBGA	Thermally-enhanced plastic ball-grid array	
CBGA	Ceramic ball-grid array	
OBGA	Organic ball-grid array	
TFBGA	Thin fine-pitch ball-grid array	
PBGA	Plastic ball-grid array	
MAP-BGA	Mold array process - ball-grid array	
UCSP	Micro (μ) chip-scale package	Similar to a BGA (A Maxim trademark example)
μBGA	Micro ball-grid array	Ball spacing less than 1 mm
LFBGA	Low-profile fine-pitch ball-grid array	
TBGA	Thin ball-grid array	
SBGA	Super ball-grid array	Above 500 balls
UFBGA	Ultra-fine ball-grid array	

== Transistor, diode, small-pin-count IC packages ==
A drawing of a ZN414 IC in a TO-18 package

- MELF: Metal electrode leadless face (usually for resistors and diodes)
- SOD: Small-outline diode
- SOT: Small-outline transistor (also SOT-23, SOT-223, SOT-323)
- TO-XX: wide range of small pin count packages often used for discrete parts like transistors or diodes
  - TO-3: Panel-mount with leads
  - TO-5: Metal can package with radial leads
  - TO-18: Metal can package with radial leads
  - TO-39: Similar to TO-5 with shorter leads
  - TO-46: Similar to TO-18 with lower cap height
  - TO-66: Similar shape to the TO-3 but smaller
  - TO-92: Plastic-encapsulated package with three leads
  - TO-99: Metal can package with eight radial leads
  - TO-100: Metal can package with ten radial leads, similar to TO-99
  - TO-126: Plastic-encapsulated package with three leads and a hole for mounting on a heat sink
  - TO-220: Through-hole plastic package with a (usually) metal heat sink tab and three leads
  - TO-226
  - TO-247: Plastic-encapsulated package with three leads and a hole for mounting on a heat sink
  - TO-251: Also called IPAK: SMT package similar to the DPAK but with longer leads for SMT or TH mounting
  - TO-252: (also called SOT428, DPAK):
  - TO-262: Also called I2PAK: SMT package similar to the D2PAK but with longer leads for SMT or TH mounting
  - TO-263: Also called D2PAK: SMT package similar to the TO-220 without the extended tab and mounting hole
  - TO-274: Also called Super-247: SMT package similar to the TO-247 without the mounting hole

== Dimension reference ==
=== Surface-mount ===
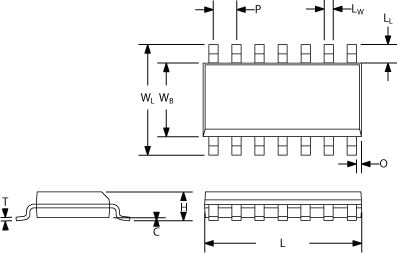
A general surface mount chip, with major dimensions.

- C – Clearance between IC body and PCB
- H – Total height
- T – Lead thickness
- L – Total carrier length
- L_{W} – Lead width
- L_{L} – Lead length
- P – Pitch

=== Through-hole ===
A general through-hole pin chip, with major dimensions.

- C – Clearance between IC body and board
- H – Total height
- T – Lead thickness
- L – Total carrier length
- L_{W} – Lead width
- L_{L} – Lead length
- P – Pitch
- W_{B} – IC body width
- W_{L} – Lead-to-lead width

== Package dimensions ==
All measurements below are given in mm. To convert mm to mils, divide mm by 0.0254 (i.e., 2.54 mm / 0.0254 = 100 mil).

C
Clearance between package body and PCB.
H
Height of package from pin tip to top of package.
T
Thickness of pin.
L
Length of package body only.
L_{W}
Pin width.
L_{L}
Pin length from package to pin tip.
P
Pin pitch (distance between conductors to the PCB).
W_{B}
Width of the package body only.
W_{L}
Length from pin tip to pin tip on the opposite side.

=== Dual row ===
Image	Family	Pin	Name	Package	L	W_{B}	W_{L}	H	C	P	L_{L}	T	L_{W}
	DIP	Y	Dual inline package	8-DIP	9.2–9.8	6.2–6.48	7.62	7.7		2.54 (0.1 in)	3.05–3.6		1.14–1.73
	DIP	Y	Dual inline package	32-DIP			15.24			2.54 (0.1 in)			
	LFCSP	N	Lead-frame chip-scale package							0.5			
	MSOP	Y	Mini small-outline package	8-MSOP	3	3	4.9	1.1	0.10	0.65	0.95	0.18	0.17–0.27
	MSOP	Y	Mini small-outline package	10-MSOP	3	3	4.9	1.1	0.10	0.5	0.95	0.18	0.17–0.27
	MSOP	Y	Mini small-outline package	16-MSOP	4.04	3	4.9	1.1	0.10	0.5	0.95	0.18	0.17–0.27
	SO; SOIC; SOP	Y	Small-outline integrated circuit	8-SOIC	4.8–5.0	3.9	5.8–6.2	1.72	0.10–0.25	1.27	1.05	0.19–0.25	0.39–0.46
	SO; SOIC; SOP	Y	Small-outline integrated circuit	14-SOIC	8.55–8.75	3.9	5.8–6.2	1.72	0.10–0.25	1.27	1.05	0.19–0.25	0.39–0.46
	SO; SOIC; SOP	Y	Small-outline integrated circuit	16-SOIC	9.9–10	3.9	5.8–6.2	1.72	0.10–0.25	1.27	1.05	0.19–0.25	0.39–0.46
	SO; SOIC; SOP	Y	Small-outline integrated circuit	16-SOIC	10.1–10.5	7.5	10.00–10.65	2.65	0.10–0.30	1.27	1.4	0.23–0.32	0.38–0.40
	SOT	Y	Small-outline transistor	SOT-23-6	2.9	1.6	2.8	1.45		0.95	0.6		0.22–0.38
	SSOP	Y	Shrink small-outline package							0.65			
	TDFN	N	Thin dual flat no-lead	8-TDFN	3	3	3	0.7–0.8		0.65	—N/a		0.19–0.3
	TSOP	Y	Thin small-outline package							0.5			
TSSOP Package	TSSOP	Y	Thin shrink small-outline package	8-TSSOP	2.9-3.1	4.3-4.5	6.4	1.2	0.15	0.65		0.09–0.2	0.19–0.3
TSSOP Package	TSSOP	Y	Thin shrink small-outline package	14-TSSOP	4.9-5.1	4.3-4.5	6.4	1.1	0.05-0.15	0.65		0.09-0.2	0.19-0.30
TSSOP Package	TSSOP	Y	Thin shrink small-outline package	20-TSSOP	6.4-6.6	4.3-4.5	6.4	1.1	.05-0.15	0.65		0.09-0.2	0.19-0.30
	μSOP	Y	Micro small-outline package	μSOP-8	3		4.9	1.1		0.65			
	US8	Y	US8 package		2	2.3	3.1	.7		0.5			

=== Quad rows ===
Image	Family	Pin	Name	Package	W_{B}	W_{L}	H	C	L	P	L_{L}	T	L_{W}
	PLCC	N	Plastic leaded chip-carrier							1.27			
	CLCC	N	Ceramic leadless chip-carrier	48-CLCC	14.22	14.22	2.21		14.22	1.016	—N/a		0.508
	LQFP	Y	Low-profile quad flat package							0.50			
	TQFP	Y	Thin quad flat-package	TQFP-44	10.00	12.00		0.35–0.50		0.80	1.00	0.09–0.20	0.30–0.45
	TQFN	N	Thin quad flat no-lead										

=== LGA ===
Package	x	y	z
52-ULGA	12 mm	17 mm	0.65 mm
52-ULGA	14 mm	18 mm	0.10 mm
52-VELGA	?	?	?

== Multi-chip packages ==
A variety of techniques for interconnecting several chips within a single package have been proposed and researched:

- SiP (System in a package)
- PoP (package on package)
- 3D-SICs, Monolithic 3D ICs, and other three-dimensional integrated circuits
- Multi-chip module
- WSI (wafer-scale integration)
- Proximity communication

== By terminal count ==
Example of component sizes, metric and imperial codes and comparison included

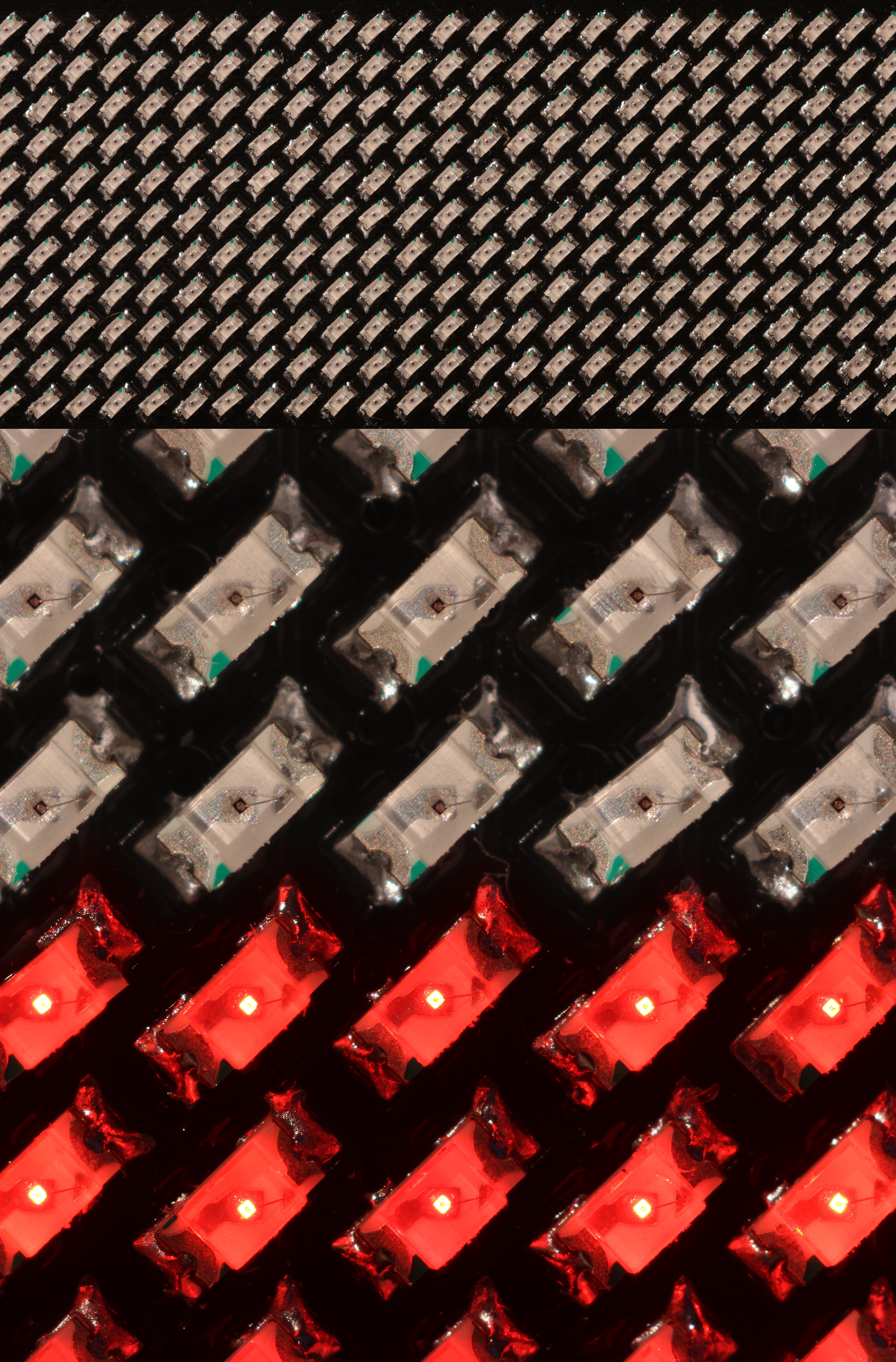
Composite image of a 11×44 LED matrix lapel name tag display using 1608/0603-type SMD LEDs. Top: A little over half of the 21×86 mm display. Center: Close-up of LEDs in ambient light. Bottom: LEDs in their own red light.

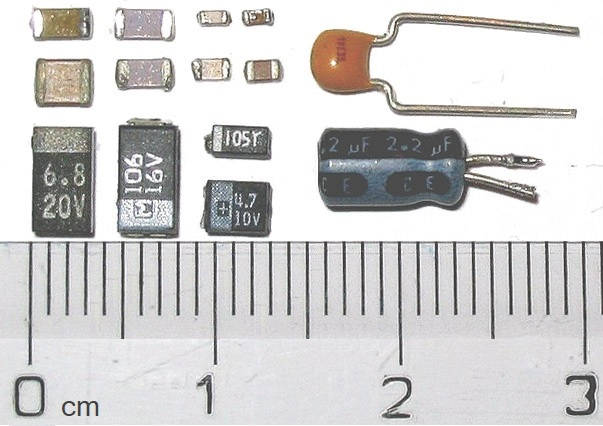
SMD capacitors (on the left) with two through-hole capacitors (on the right)

Surface-mount components are usually smaller than their counterparts with leads, and are designed to be handled by machines rather than by humans. The electronics industry has standardized package shapes and sizes (the leading standardisation body is JEDEC).

The codes given in the chart below usually tell the length and width of the components in tenths of millimeters or hundredths of inches. For example, a metric 2520 component is 2.5 mm by 2.0 mm which corresponds roughly to 0.10 inches by 0.08 inches (hence, imperial size is 1008). Exceptions occur for imperial in the two smallest rectangular passive sizes. The metric codes still represent the dimensions in mm, even though the imperial size codes are no longer aligned. Problematically, some manufacturers are developing metric 0201 components with dimensions of 0.25 mm × 0.125 mm (0.0098 in × 0.0049 in), but the imperial 01005 name is already being used for the 0.4 mm × 0.2 mm (0.0157 in × 0.0079 in) package. These increasingly small sizes, especially 0201 and 01005, can sometimes be a challenge from a manufacturability or reliability perspective.

=== Two-terminal packages ===
==== Rectangular passive components ====
Mostly resistors and capacitors.

Package		Approximate dimensions, length × width		Typical resistor power rating (W)
Metric	Imperial	Approximate dimensions, length × width		Typical resistor power rating (W)
0201	008004	0.25 mm × 0.125 mm	0.010 in × 0.005 in	
03015	009005	0.3 mm × 0.15 mm	0.012 in × 0.006 in	0.02
0402	01005	0.4 mm × 0.2 mm	0.016 in × 0.008 in	0.031
0603	0201	0.6 mm × 0.3 mm	0.02 in × 0.01 in	0.05
1005	0402	1.0 mm × 0.5 mm	0.04 in × 0.02 in	0.062–0.1
1608	0603	1.6 mm × 0.8 mm	0.06 in × 0.03 in	0.1
2012	0805	2.0 mm × 1.25 mm	0.08 in × 0.05 in	0.125
2520	1008	2.5 mm × 2.0 mm	0.10 in × 0.08 in	
3216	1206	3.2 mm × 1.6 mm	0.125 in × 0.06 in	0.25
3225	1210	3.2 mm × 2.5 mm	0.125 in × 0.10 in	0.5
4516	1806	4.5 mm × 1.6 mm	0.18 in × 0.06 in	
4532	1812	4.5 mm × 3.2 mm	0.18 in × 0.125 in	0.75
4564	1825	4.5 mm × 6.4 mm	0.18 in × 0.25 in	0.75
5025	2010	5.0 mm × 2.5 mm	0.20 in × 0.10 in	0.75
6332	2512	6.3 mm × 3.2 mm	0.25 in × 0.125 in	1
6863	2725	6.9 mm × 6.3 mm	0.27 in × 0.25 in	3
7451	2920	7.4 mm × 5.1 mm	0.29 in × 0.20 in	

==== Tantalum capacitors ====
Package	Dimensions (Length, typ. × width, typ. × height, max.)
EIA 2012-12 (KEMET R, AVX R)	2.0 mm × 1.3 mm × 1.2 mm
EIA 3216-10 (KEMET I, AVX K)	3.2 mm × 1.6 mm × 1.0 mm
EIA 3216-12 (KEMET S, AVX S)	3.2 mm × 1.6 mm × 1.2 mm
EIA 3216-18 (KEMET A, AVX A)	3.2 mm × 1.6 mm × 1.8 mm
EIA 3528-12 (KEMET T, AVX T)	3.5 mm × 2.8 mm × 1.2 mm
EIA 3528-21 (KEMET B, AVX B)	3.5 mm × 2.8 mm × 2.1 mm
EIA 6032-15 (KEMET U, AVX W)	6.0 mm × 3.2 mm × 1.5 mm
EIA 6032-28 (KEMET C, AVX C)	6.0 mm × 3.2 mm × 2.8 mm
EIA 7260-38 (KEMET E, AVX V)	7.2 mm × 6.0 mm × 3.8 mm
EIA 7343-20 (KEMET V, AVX Y)	7.3 mm × 4.3 mm × 2.0 mm
EIA 7343-31 (KEMET D, AVX D)	7.3 mm × 4.3 mm × 3.1 mm
EIA 7343-43 (KEMET X, AVX E)	7.3 mm × 4.3 mm × 4.3 mm

==== Aluminum capacitors ====
Package	Dimensions (Length, typ. × width, typ. × height, max.)
Cornell-Dubilier A	3.3 mm × 3.3 mm × 5.5 mm
Chemi-Con D	4.3 mm × 4.3 mm × 5.7 mm
Panasonic B	4.3 mm × 4.3 mm × 6.1 mm
Chemi-Con E	5.3 mm × 5.3 mm × 5.7 mm
Panasonic C	5.3 mm × 5.3 mm × 6.1 mm
Chemi-Con F	6.6 mm × 6.6 mm × 5.7 mm
Panasonic D	6.6 mm × 6.6 mm × 6.1 mm
Panasonic E/F, Chemi-Con H	8.3 mm × 8.3 mm × 6.5 mm
Panasonic G, Chemi-Con J	10.3 mm × 10.3 mm × 10.5 mm
Chemi-Con K	13 mm × 13 mm × 14 mm
Panasonic H	13.5 mm × 13.5 mm × 14 mm
Panasonic J, Chemi-Con L	17 mm × 17 mm × 17 mm
Panasonic K, Chemi-Con M	19 mm × 19 mm × 17 mm

==== Small-outline diode (SOD) ====
Package	Dimensions (Length, typ. × width, typ. × height, max.)
SOD-80C	3.5 mm × ⌀ 1.5 mm
SOD-123	2.65 mm × 1.6 mm × 1.35 mm
SOD-128	3.8 mm × 2.5 mm × 1.1 mm
SOD-323 (SC-76)	1.7 mm × 1.25 mm × 1.1 mm
SOD-523 (SC-79)	1.2 mm × 0.8 mm × 0.65 mm
SOD-723	1.0 mm × 0.6 mm × 0.65 mm
SOD-923	0.8 mm × 0.6 mm × 0.4 mm

==== Metal electrode leadless face (MELF) ====
Mostly resistors and diodes; barrel shaped components, dimensions do not match those of rectangular references for identical codes.

Package	Dimensions	Typical resistor rating	
Package	Dimensions	Power (W)	Voltage (V)
MicroMELF (MMU), 0102	2.2 mm × ⌀ 1.1 mm	0.2–0.3	150
MiniMELF (MMA), 0204	3.6 mm × ⌀ 1.4 mm	0.25–0.4	200
MELF (MMB), 0207	5.8 mm × ⌀ 2.2 mm	0.4–1.0	300

==== DO-214 ====
Commonly used for rectifier, Schottky, and other diodes.

Package	Dimensions (incl. leads) (Length, typ. × width, typ. × height, max.)
DO-214AA (SMB)	5.4 mm × 3.6 mm × 2.65 mm
DO-214AB (SMC)	7.95 mm × 5.9 mm × 2.25 mm
DO-214AC (SMA)	5.2 mm × 2.6 mm × 2.15 mm

=== Three- and four-terminal packages ===
==== Small-outline transistor (SOT) ====
Package	Aliases	Dimensions (excl. leads) (Length, typ. × width, typ. × height, max.)	Number of terminals	Remark
SOT-23-3	TO-236-3, SC-59	2.92 mm × 1.3 mm × 1.12 mm	3	
SOT-89	TO-243, SC-62	4.5 mm × 2.5 mm × 1.5 mm	4	Center pin is connected to a large heat-transfer pad
SOT-143	TO-253	2.9 mm × 1.3 mm × 1.22 mm	4	Tapered body, one larger pad denotes terminal 1
SOT-223	TO-261	6.5 mm × 3.5 mm × 1.8 mm	4	One terminal is a large heat-transfer pad
SOT-323	SC-70	2 mm × 1.25 mm × 1.1 mm	3	
SOT-416	SC-75	1.6 mm × 0.8 mm × 0.9 mm	3	
SOT-663		1.6 mm × 1.2 mm × 0.6 mm	3	
SOT-723		1.2 mm × 0.8 mm × 0.55	3	Has flat leads
SOT-883	SC-101	1 mm × 0.6 mm × 0.5 mm	3	Is lead-less

==== Other ====
- DPAK (TO-252, SOT-428): Discrete Packaging. Developed by Motorola to house higher powered devices. Comes in three or five-terminal versions.
- D2PAK (TO-263, SOT-404): Bigger than the DPAK; basically a surface mount equivalent of the TO220 through-hole package. Comes in 3, 5, 6, 7, 8 or 9-terminal versions.
- D3PAK (TO-268): Even larger than D2PAK.

=== Five- and six-terminal packages ===
==== Small-outline transistor (SOT) ====
Package	Aliases	Dimensions (excl. leads) (Length, typ. × width, typ. × height, max.)	Number of terminals	Leaded or leadless
SOT-23-6	SOT-26, SC-74	2.9 mm × 1.3 mm × 1.3 mm	6	Leaded
SOT-353	SC-88A	2 mm × 1.25 mm × 0.95 mm	5	Leaded
SOT-363	SC-88, SC-70-6	2 mm × 1.25 mm × 0.95 mm	6	Leaded
SOT-563		1.6 mm × 1.2 mm × 0.6 mm	6	Leaded
SOT-665		1.6 mm × 1.6 mm × 0.55 mm	5	Leaded
SOT-666		1.6 mm × 1.2 mm × 0.6 mm	6	Leaded
SOT-886		1.45 mm × 1 mm × 0.5 mm	6	Leadless
SOT-891		1 mm × 1 mm × 0.5 mm	6	Leadless
SOT-953		1 mm × 0.8 mm × 0.5 mm	5	Leaded
SOT-963		1 mm × 1 mm × 0.5 mm	6	Leaded
SOT-1115		1 mm × 0.9 mm × 0.35 mm	6	Leadless
SOT-1202		1 mm × 1 mm × 0.35 mm	6	Leadless

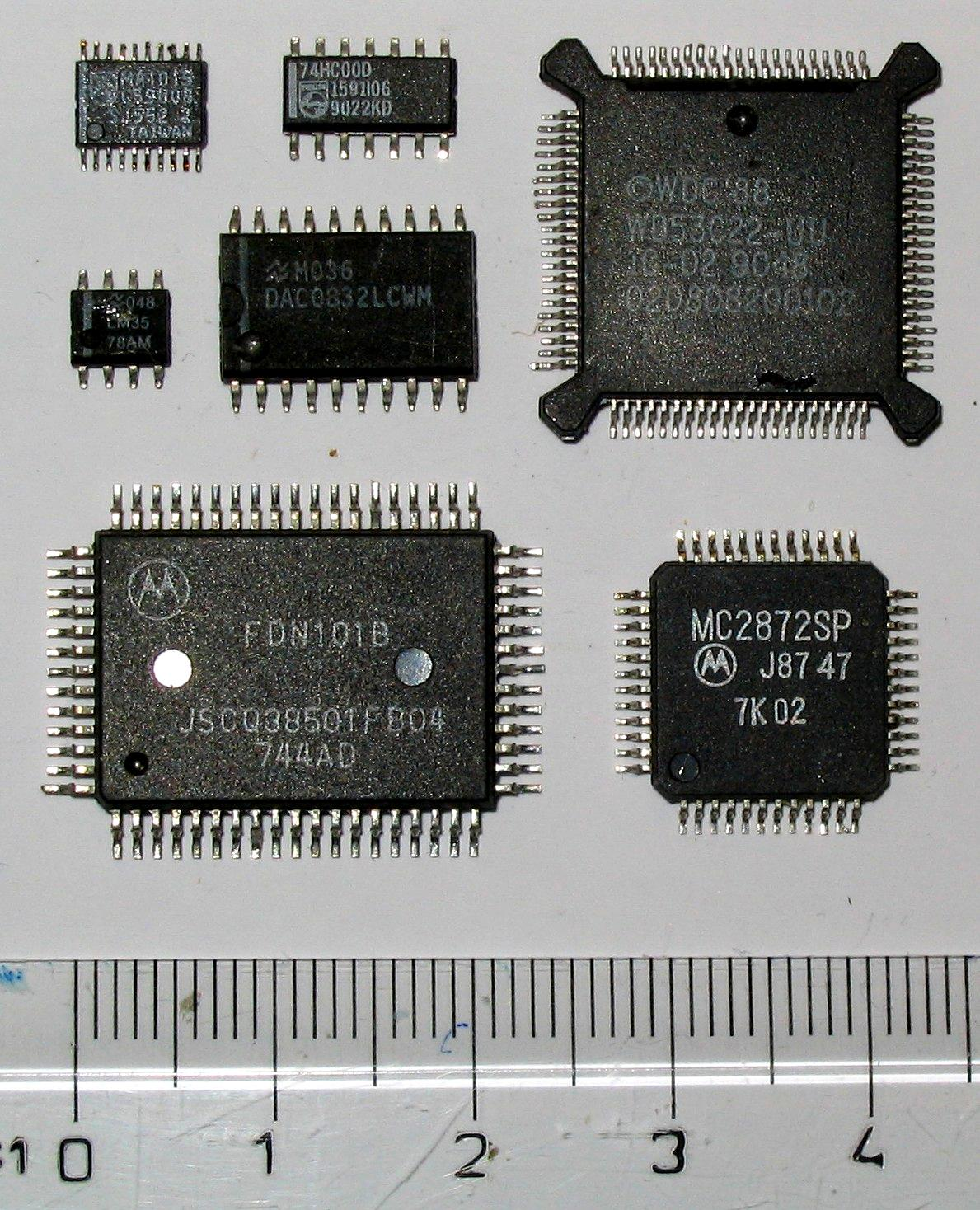
Various SMD chips, desoldered

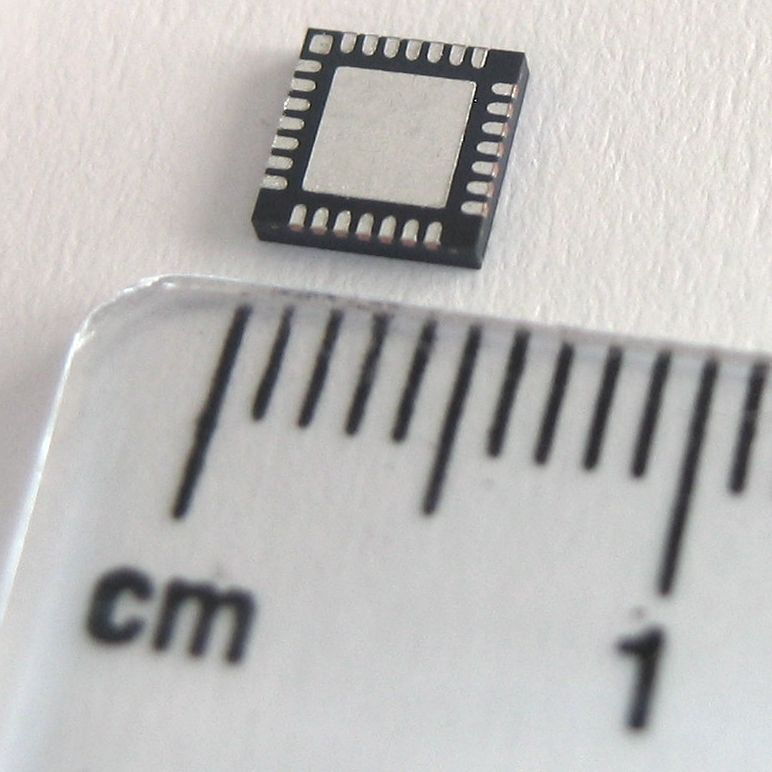
MLP package 28-pin chip, upside down to show contacts

=== Packages with more than six terminals ===
==== Dual-in-line ====
- Flatpack was one of the earliest surface-mounted packages.
- Small-outline integrated circuit (SOIC): dual-in-line, 8 or more pins, gull-wing lead form, pin spacing 1.27 mm.
- Small-outline package, J-leaded (SOJ): The same as SOIC except J-leaded.
- Thin small-outline package (TSOP): thinner than SOIC with smaller pin spacing of 0.5 mm.
- Shrink small-outline package (SSOP): pin spacing of 0.65 mm, sometimes 0.635 mm or in some cases 0.8 mm.
- Thin shrink small-outline package (TSSOP).
- Quarter-size small-outline package (QSOP): with pin spacing of 0.635 mm.
- Very small outline package (VSOP): even smaller than QSOP; 0.4-, 0.5-, or 0.65-mm pin spacing.
- Dual flat no-lead (DFN): smaller footprint than leaded equivalent.

==== Quad-in-line ====
- Plastic leaded chip carrier (PLCC): square, J-lead, pin spacing 1.27 mm
- Quad flat package (QFP): various sizes, with pins on all four sides
- Low-profile quad flat-package (LQFP): 1.4 mm high, varying sized and pins on all four sides
- Plastic quad flat-pack (PQFP), a square with pins on all four sides, 44 or more pins
- Ceramic quad flat-pack (CQFP): similar to PQFP
- Metric quad flat-pack (MQFP): a QFP package with metric pin distribution
- Thin quad flat-pack (TQFP), a thinner version of LQFP
- Quad flat no-lead (QFN): smaller footprint than leaded equivalent
- Leadless chip carrier (LCC): contacts are recessed vertically to "wick-in" solder. Common in aviation electronics because of robustness to mechanical vibration.
- Micro leadframe package (MLP, MLF): with a 0.5 mm contact pitch, no leads (same as QFN)
- Power quad flat no-lead (PQFN): with exposed die-pads for heatsinking

==== Grid arrays ====
- Ball grid array (BGA): A square or rectangular array of solder balls on one surface, ball spacing typically 1.27 mm (0.050 in)
  - Fine-pitch ball grid array (FBGA): A square or rectangular array of solder balls on one surface
  - Low-profile fine-pitch ball grid array (LFBGA): A square or rectangular array of solder balls on one surface, ball spacing typically 0.8 mm
  - Micro ball grid array (μBGA): Ball spacing less than 1 mm
  - Thin fine-pitch ball grid array (TFBGA): A square or rectangular array of solder balls on one surface, ball spacing typically 0.5 mm
- Land grid array (LGA): An array of bare lands only. Similar to in appearance to QFN, but mating is by spring pins within a socket rather than solder.
- Column grid array (CGA): A circuit package in which the input and output points are high-temperature solder cylinders or columns arranged in a grid pattern.
  - Ceramic column grid array (CCGA): A circuit package in which the input and output points are high-temperature solder cylinders or columns arranged in a grid pattern. The body of the component is ceramic.
- Lead-less package (LLP): A package with metric pin distribution (0.5 mm pitch).

==== Non-packaged devices ====
Although surface-mount, these devices require specific process for assembly.

- Chip-on-board (COB), a bare silicon chip, that is usually an integrated circuit, is supplied without a package (which is usually a lead frame overmolded with epoxy) and is attached, often with epoxy, directly to a circuit board. The chip is then wire bonded and protected from mechanical damage and contamination by an epoxy "glob-top".
- Chip-on-flex (COF), a variation of COB, where a chip is mounted directly to a flex circuit. Tape-automated bonding process is also a chip-on-flex process as well.
- Chip-on-glass (COG), a variation of COB, where a chip, typically a liquid crystal display (LCD) controller, is mounted directly on glass.
- Chip-on-wire (COW), a variation of COB, where a chip, typically a LED or RFID chip, is mounted directly on wire, thus making it a very thin and flexible wire. Such wire may then be covered with cotton, glass or other materials to make into smart textiles or electronic textiles.

There are often subtle variations in package details from manufacturer to manufacturer, and even though standard designations are used, designers need to confirm dimensions when laying out printed circuit boards.

== See also ==
- Surface-mount technology
- Three-dimensional integrated circuit
- Interposer
- IPC (electronics)
- List of chip carriers
- List of electronics package dimensions
- Redistribution layer
- Small-outline transistor
- Wafer-level packaging
