= Pin compatibility =

Electronics design technique

In electronics, pin-compatible devices are electronic components, generally integrated circuits or expansion cards, sharing a common footprint and with the same functions assigned or usable on the same pins. Pin compatibility is a property desired by systems integrators as it allows a product to be updated without redesigning printed circuit boards, which can reduce costs and decrease time to market.

Although devices which are pin compatible share a common footprint, they are not necessarily electrically or thermally compatible. As a result, manufacturers often specify devices as being either pin-to-pin or drop-in compatible. Pin-compatible devices are generally produced to allow upgrading within a single product line, to allow end-of-life devices to be replaced with newer equivalents, or to compete with the equivalent products of other manufacturers.

== Pin-to-pin compatibility ==
Pin-to-pin compatible devices share an assignment of functions to pins, but may have differing electrical characteristics (supply voltages, or oscillator frequencies) or thermal characteristics (TDPs, reflow curves, or temperature tolerances). As a result, their use in a system may require that portions of the system, such as its power delivery subsystem, be adapted to fit the new component.

A common example of pin-to-pin compatible devices which may not be electrically compatible is the 7400 series integrated circuits. The 7400 series devices have been produced on a number of different manufacturing processes, but have retained the same pinouts throughout. For example, all 7405 devices provide six NOT gates (or inverters) but may have incompatible supply voltage tolerances.

- 7405 – Standard TTL, 4.75–5.25 V.
- 74C05 – CMOS, 4–15 V.
- 74LV05 – Low-voltage CMOS, 2.0–5.5 V.

In other cases, particularly with computers, devices may be pin-to-pin compatible but made otherwise incompatible as a result of market segmentation. For example, Intel Skylake desktop-class Core and Xeon E3v5 processors both use the LGA 1151 socket, but motherboards using C230-series chipsets will only be compatible with Xeon-branded processors, and will not work with Core-branded processors.

== Drop-in compatibility ==
A drop-in compatible device is a device which may be swapped with another without need to make compensating alterations to the system the device was a part of. The device will have the same functions available on the same pins, and will be electrically and thermally compatible. Such devices may not be an exact match to the devices they can replace. For example, they may have a wider range of supply voltage or temperature tolerances.

== Software compatibility ==
Software-compatible devices are devices which are able to run the same software to produce the same results without the software having to be modified first.

Microcontrollers, FPGAs, and other programmable devices may be pin-to-pin compatible from the perspective of the program on the device, but incompatible in terms of hardware. For example, the device may take the signal on pin X, negate it, and output the result on pin Y. If the method of configuring a pin remains the same but the package of the device (such as TSSOP or QFN) changes, the program will continue to function but the physical locations of the pins the program works with may change.

A device may also be pin-compatible while being software-incompatible. This may occur when the device uses a different instruction set, or if the device has a multiplexer attached to a pin (which, for example, may allow the switching of the pin between being driven as GPIO or by an A/D) and that multiplexer selects, by default, a different input source than is selected on the device being replaced.

To ease the use of software-incompatible devices, manufacturers often provide hardware abstraction layers. Examples of these include, CMSIS for ARM Cortex-M processors and the now-deprecated HAL subsystem for UNIX-like operating systems.

== See also ==
- 7400 series integrated circuits
- Programmable logic device
- Logic family
- Semiconductor package
- second source
