= EZCast =

- Developer: Actions Microelectronics
- Type: Digital media player
- Operating system: Cross-platform
- Website: EZCast

EZCast is a line of digital media players, built by Actions Microelectronics, that allows users to mirror media content from smart devices, including mobile devices, personal computers, and project to high-definition televisions.

== History ==
The first generation of EZCast was developed in 2013, shipped 1 million units within a year, and accumulated more than 2 million EZCast app users worldwide. The latest device in the family, called EZCast 4K, was launched in November 2016 which supports 4K HEVC video streaming.

EZCast technology is built into a dongle that interacts with EZCast app to stream content from smart devices, and it works across Android, ChromeOS, iOS, macOS, Windows and Windows Phone.

EZCast SDK has been released to enable third party development on Android and iOS.

In 2018, it became possible to voice control EZCast 2 and EZCast 4K devices using Google Assistant.

== Technology ==
EZCast devices all come equipped with Actions Microelectronics SoCs and Linux-based software that supports Miracast/DLNA and/or USB video for iOS and Android.

WiFi to Display SoCs
| SoC Model | Decoding | Interface | Application |
|---|---|---|---|
| AM8268/C | 1080p60 H.264 | WiFi 4/5; HDMI Out | Dongle (LQFP128) |
| AM8269/D | 1080p60 H.264 | WiFi 4/5; HDMI Out | Cable (QFN68, Embedded RAM) |
| AM8280 | 1080p60 H.264 | WiFi 4/5; HDMI/VGA; DLP/LCD Out | Projector SoC (TFBGA324) |
| AM8271/2 | 4k30 HEVC | WiFi 4/5; HDMI Out | Dongle (LQFP144) |
| AM8275 | 4k60 HDR HEVC | WiFi 5 HDMI Out | Dedicated Box (TFBGA324) |

USB to Display SoCs
| SoC Model | Decoding | Interface | Application |
|---|---|---|---|
| AM8268L/W | 1080p60 H.264 | USB-C/Lightning; Android/iOS | Dongle (LQFP128) |
| AM8268D/N | 1080p60 H.264 | USB-C/Lightning; Android/iOS | Dongle, Cable (QFN68, Embedded RAM) |
