= Mini Small Outline Package =

Mini Small Outline ic Package

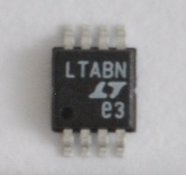
A surface-mount IC in the MSOP form-factor

The Mini Small Outline Package (MSOP) is a miniaturized version of the small outline integrated circuit packaging format for integrated circuits. Some vendors, e.g. Texas Instruments, refer to this form factor as Very Thin Shrink Small Outline Package (VSSOP).

== Application ==
Many integrated circuits are available in the MSOP form factor. They are suited for space-limited applications requiring 1 mm or less mounted height and are commonly used in disk drives, video/audio and consumer electronics.

== Physical properties ==
The size of the Mini Small Outline Package is only 3mm × 3mm for the 8 and 10 pin versions and 3mm × 4mm for the 12 and 16 pin version. The small package offers a small footprint, short wires for improved electrical connections, and good moisture reliability. Some versions have an exposed pad on the bottom side. The exposed pad will be soldered on the PCB to transfer heat from the package to the PCB.

Package	Pins	Body width (mm)	Body length (mm)	Lead pitch (mm)
MSOP8	8	3	3	0.65
MSOP10	10	3	3	0.5
MSOP12	12	3	4	0.65
MSOP16	16	3	4	0.5

== Synonyms ==
- μMAX or micro max - Maxim name for the MSOP package.
- μMAX-EP or micro max exposed pad - Maxim name for the MSOP package with exposed pad.
- MSE - Linear Technology name for the MSOP package with exposed pad.

== See also ==
- List of electronic component packaging types
