= Umax =

UMAX can stand for:

- "UMAX Technologies", a manufacturer of computer products.
- "μMAX", Maxim Name for a MSOP ic Package.
