= Thin shrink small outline package =

Type of integrated circuit

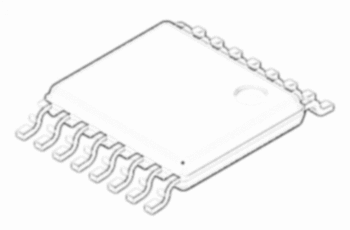
Drawing of a 16 pins TSSOP package

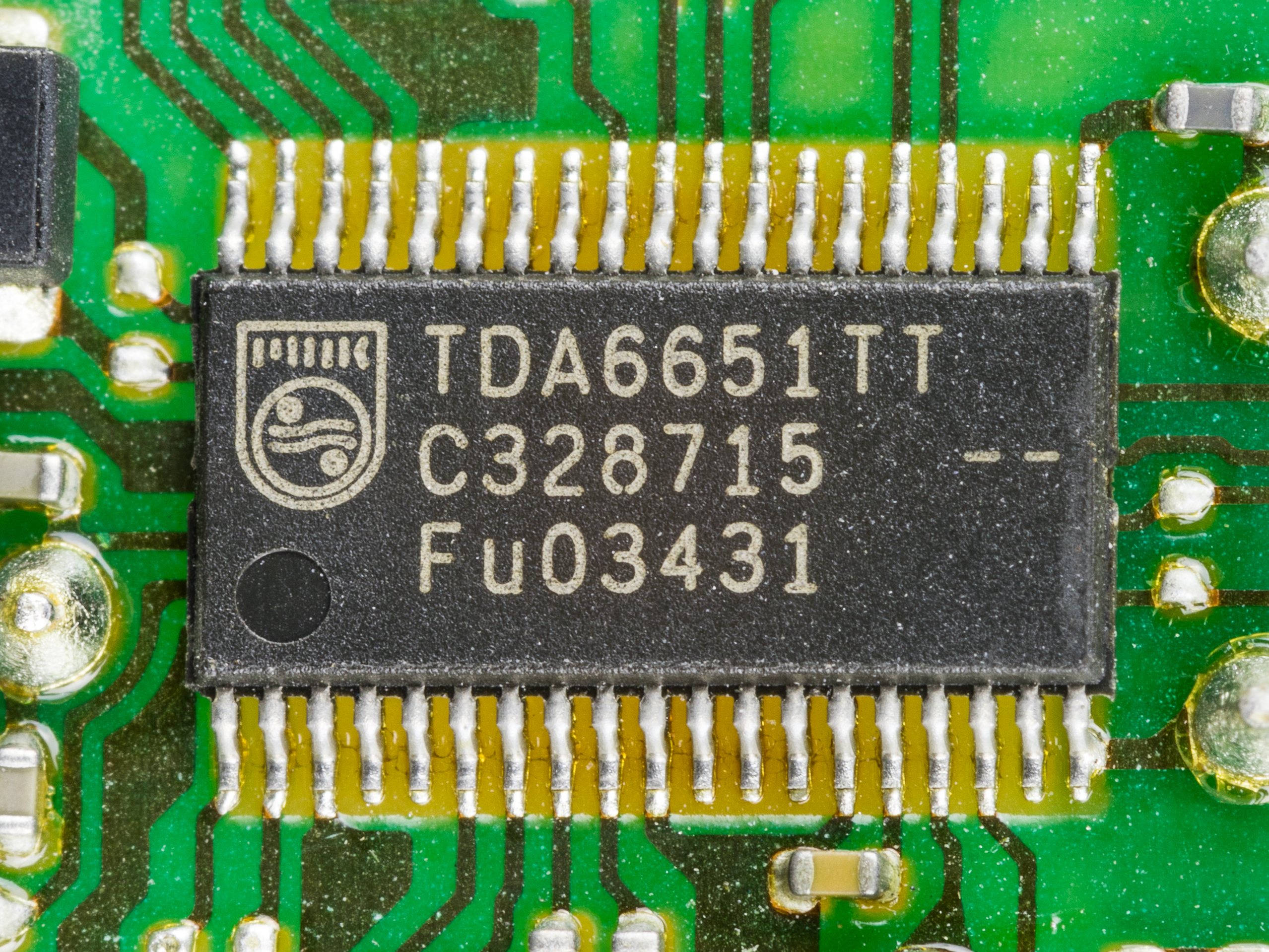
Philips TDA6651TT in TSSOP package

The Thin Shrink Small Outline Package (TSSOP) is a rectangular surface mount plastic integrated circuit (IC) package with gull-wing leads.

== Application ==
They are suited for applications requiring 1 mm or less mounted height and are commonly used in analog and operational amplifiers, controllers and Drivers, Logic, Memory, and RF/Wireless, Disk drives, video/audio and consumer electronics.

== Physical properties ==
The Thin shrink small outline package has a smaller body and smaller lead pitch than the standard SOIC package. It is also smaller and thinner than a TSOP with the same lead count. Body widths are 3.0 mm, 4.4 mm and 6.1 mm. The lead counts range from 8 to 80 pins. The lead pitches are 0.5 or 0.65 mm.

== Exposed Pad ==
Some TSSOP packages have an exposed pad. This is a rectangular metal pad on the bottom side of the package. The exposed pad will be soldered on the PCB to transfer heat from the package to the PCB. In most applications, the exposed pad is connected to ground.

=== HTSSOP ===
The Heat sink thin shrink small outline package (HTSSOP) is Texas Instruments name for a TSSOP with an exposed pad on the bottom side. There are some other manufacturers who use the same name.

== See also ==
- List of electronic component packaging types
- Small outline integrated circuit

== Similar package types ==
- Shrink Small Outline Package
- Mini Small Outline Package
- Small outline integrated circuit
