= Lead frame =

Metal structure inside a chip package that carries signals from the die to the outside

A lead frame (pronounced /lid/ LEED) is a metal structure inside a chip package that carries signals from the die to the outside, used in DIP, QFP and other packages where connections to the chip are made on its edges.

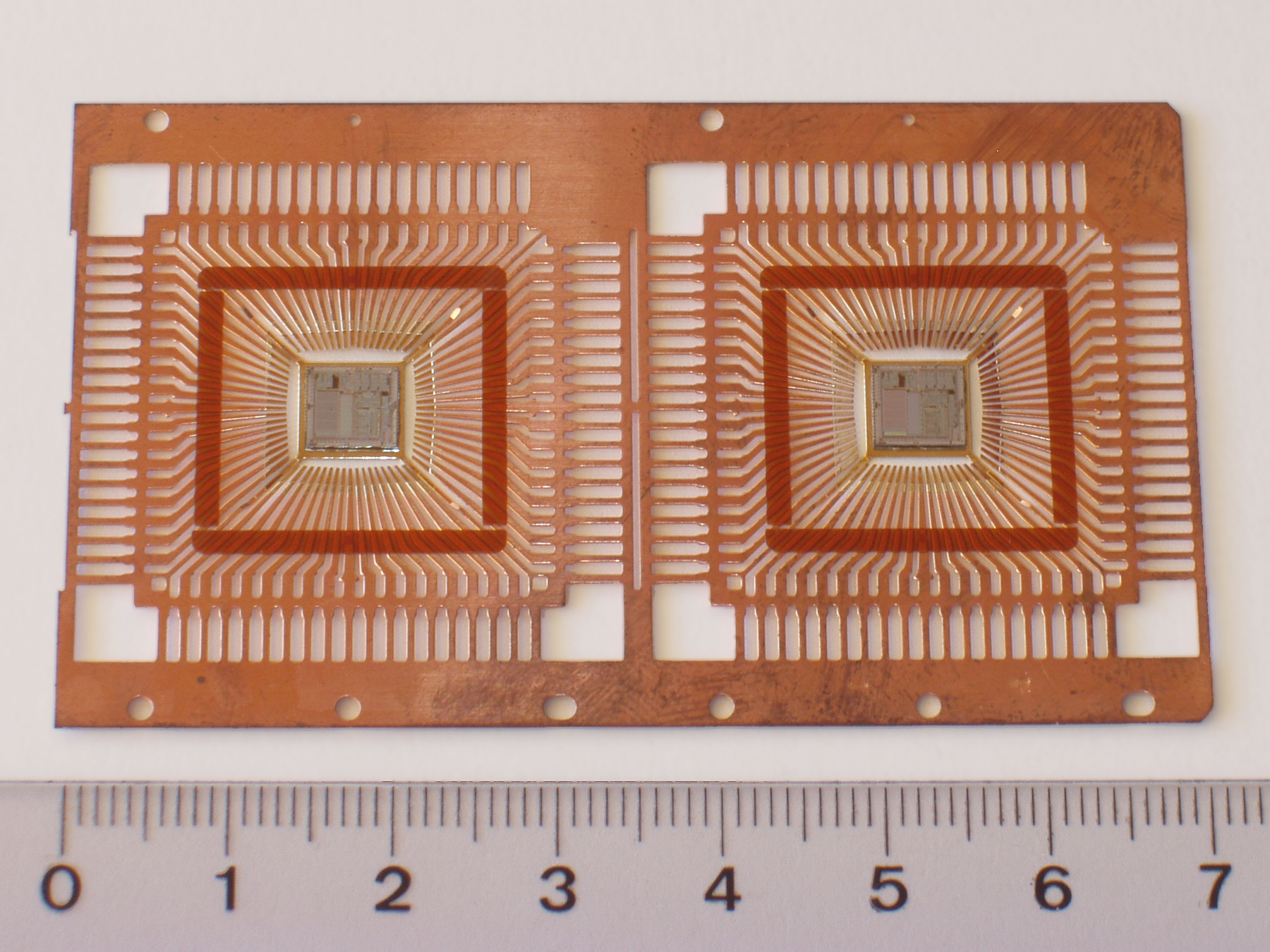
Lead frame for a QFP package, before encapsulation

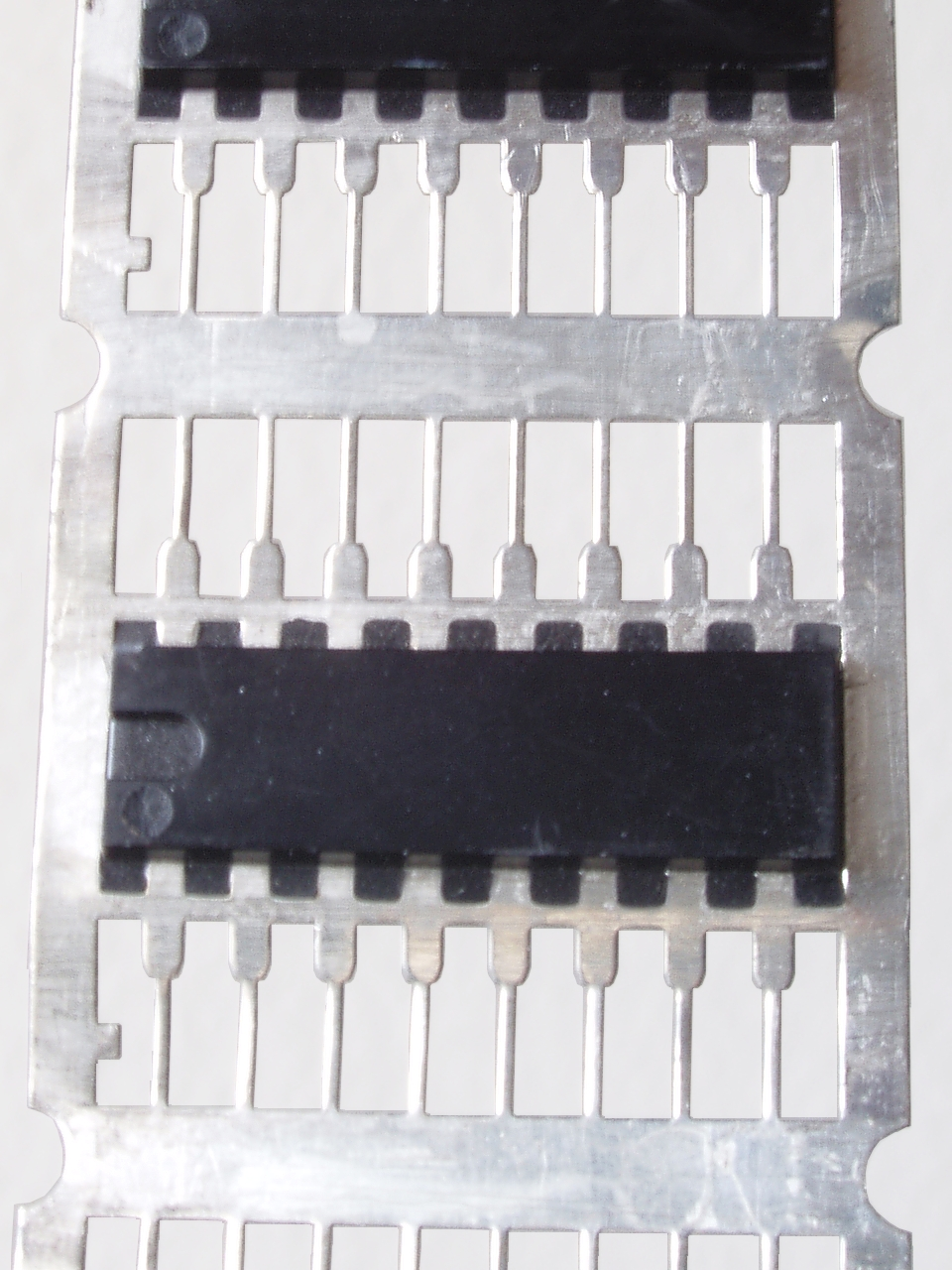
DIP 16 pin Lead frame, after encapsulation and before cutting/separation

The lead frame consists of a central die pad, where the die is placed, surrounded by leads, metal conductors leading away from the die to the outside world. The end of each lead closest to the die ends in a bond pad. Small bond wires connect the die to each bond pad. Mechanical connections fix all these parts into a rigid structure, which makes the whole lead frame easy to handle automatically.

== Manufacturing ==
Lead frames are manufactured by removing material from a flat plate of copper, copper-alloy, or iron-nickel alloy like alloy 42. Two processes used for this are etching (suitable for high density of leads), or stamping (suitable for low density of leads). The mechanical bending process can be applied after both techniques. A lead frame has two sections: a die paddle, where the die sits in the leadframe, and the leads. The leadframe is made of an alloy the molding compound can adhere to, a thermal expansion coefficient that is as close as possible to that of the die and compound, has good thermal and electrical conductivity, is strong enough and has high formability.

The die is glued or soldered to the die pad inside the lead frame, and then bond wires are attached between the die and the bond pads to connect the die to the leads in a process called wire bonding. In a process called encapsulation, a plastic case is moulded around the lead frame and die, exposing only the leads. The leads are cut off outside the plastic body and any exposed supporting structures are cut away. The external leads are then bent to the desired shape.

== Uses ==
Amongst others, lead frames are used to manufacture a quad flat no-leads package (QFN), a quad flat package (QFP), or a dual in-line package (DIP).

Advances in lead frame technology have allowed better packing techniques like routable lead frame technology that allow improved thermal and electrical performance.

== See also ==
- Chip carrier – Chip packaging and package types list
