= Beam lead technology =

Technology used to deposit metal beams onto integrated circuits for connecting them

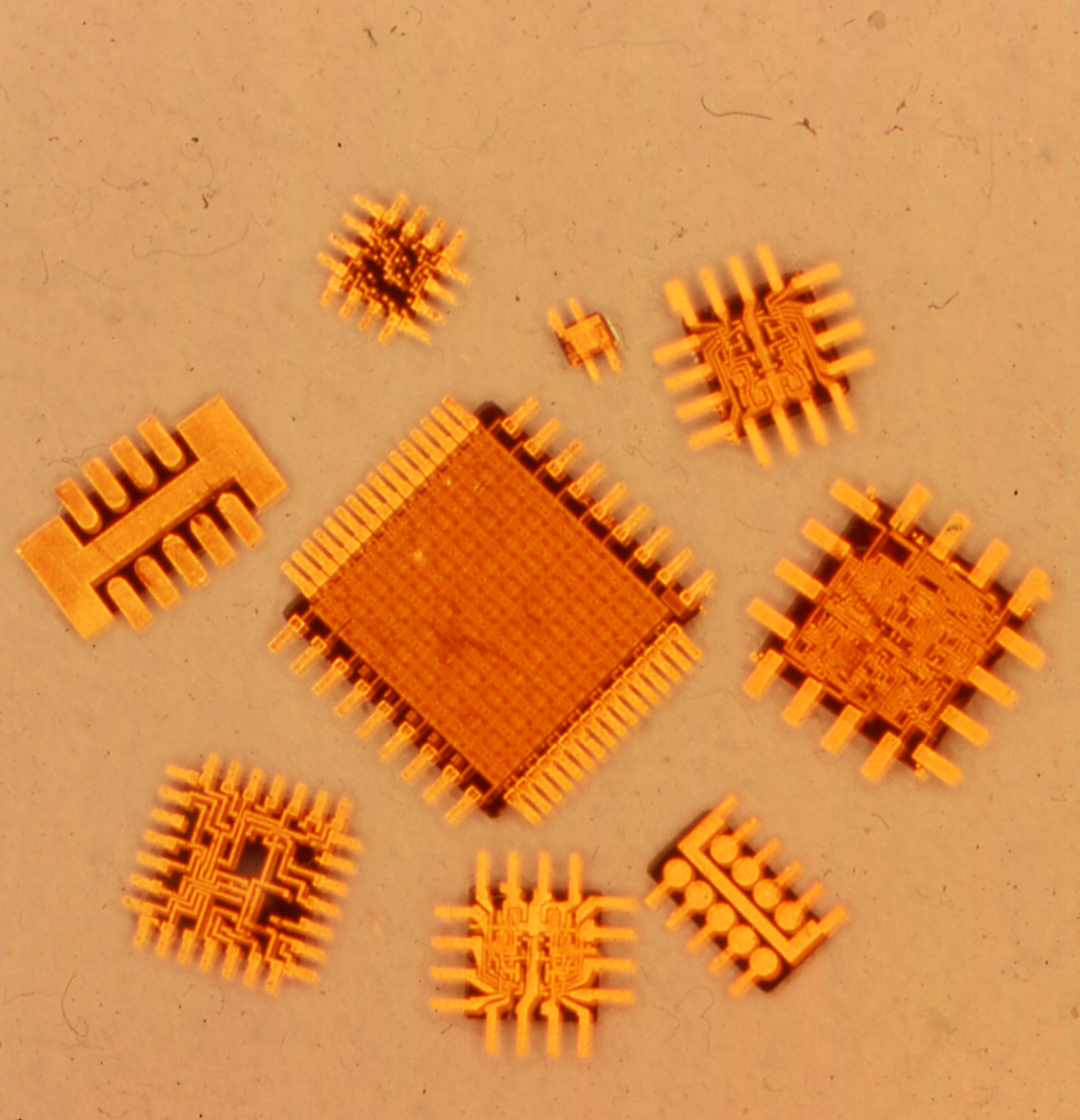
Beam lead integrated circuits

Beam lead technology is a method of fabricating a semiconductor device. Its initial application was for high-frequency silicon switching transistors and high-speed integrated circuits. This technology eliminated the labor-intensive wire-bonding process that was commonly used for integrated circuits at the time. It also enabled the automated assembly of semiconductor chips onto larger substrates, facilitating the production of hybrid integrated circuits.

== History ==
In the early 1960s, M.P. Lepselter developed techniques for fabricating a structure that involved electroforming an array of thick, self-supporting gold patterns on a thin film Ti-Pt-Au base, leading to the term "beams." These patterns were deposited on the surface of a silicon wafer. The excess semiconductor material beneath the beams was subsequently removed, resulting in the separation of individual devices and leaving them with self-supporting beam leads or internal chiplets cantilevered beyond the semiconductor material. These contacts not only served as electrical leads but also provided structural support for the devices.

== Patents ==
Patented inventions included:

1. Selective Removal of Material Using Cathodic Sputtering (Plasma Etching/RIE), US Patent #3,271,286; issued 1966
2. PtSi Semiconductor Contacts and Schottky Diodes (PtSi Schottky Diodes), US Patent #3,274,670; issued 1966
3. Semiconductive Device Including Beam Leads (Beam Leads, Ti-Pt-Au metal system), US Patent #3,426,252; issued 1969
4. Method for Making Closely Spaced Conductive Layers (Air-Insulated Crossovers, air bridges, RF-Switch), US Patent #3,461,524; issued 1969
5. Vibratory Reed Device (MEMS), US Patent #3,609,593; issued 1971

== Legacy ==
This technology, also known as air-bridge technology, has established itself in high-frequency silicon switching transistors and ultra-high-speed integrated circuits for telecommunications and missile systems. The beam lead devices, produced by the hundreds of millions, became the first example of a commercial microelectromechanical structure (MEMS).
