= Moisture sensitivity level =

Measure of device susceptibility to moisture damage

Moisture sensitivity level (MSL) relates to the packaging and handling precautions for some semiconductors and is a rating that shows a device's susceptibility to damage due to absorbed moisture when subjected to reflow soldering as defined in J-STD-020. The MSL is an electronic standard for the time period in which a moisture sensitive device can be exposed to ambient room conditions (30 °C/85%RH at Level 1; 30 °C/60%RH at all other levels) without taking measures to retard the absorption of moisture.

Modern semiconductors are typically encapsulated in molded plastic. This plastic absorbs and retains moisture from ambient air. When a semiconductor package is soldered or de-soldered, it is subjected to rapid heating. The increase in temperature will cause trapped moisture to turn to vapor, seek to expand and escape the package. The process of moisture expansion and escape can be violent and result in internal separation (delamination) of the plastic from the die or lead-frame, wire bond damage, die damage, and internal cracks. (Most of this damage is generally not visible on the component external surface and must be assessed by acoustic microscopy and/or X-ray radiology.) In more extreme cases, cracks will extend to the component surface. In the most severe cases, the component will bulge and pop, in what is commonly known as the "popcorn" effect.

Typical methods to reduce the risk of damage include: 1) baking the components at a temperature near or above 100 °C before soldering, 2) storage of susceptible components in moisture barrier bags after baking and 3) employing pre-heating of the area of the printed circuit board before soldering to decrease the temperature transient that the package will be subjected to.

Moisture sensitivity levels are specified in technical standard IPC/JEDEC Moisture/reflow Sensitivity Classification for Nonhermetic Surface-Mount Devices. The times indicate how long components can be outside of dry storage before they have to be baked to remove any absorbed moisture.

- MSL 6 – Mandatory bake before use
- MSL 5a – 24 hours
- MSL 5 – 48 hours
- MSL 4 – 72 hours
- MSL 3 – 168 hours
- MSL 2a – 4 weeks
- MSL 2 – 1 year
- MSL 1 – Unlimited floor life

Moisture sensitive devices are packaged in a moisture barrier antistatic bag with a desiccant and a moisture indicator card which is sealed.

== Practical ==
MSL-specified parts must be baked before assembly if their exposure has exceeded the rating. The approved degree of baking depends upon the thickness of the package, the exposure time to moisture, the relative humidity of the atmosphere it was exposed to and the MSL rating of the part, with thinner packages generally expected to need less baking time and at lower temperatures.

For example, an end user of a SOT-223, MSL 3 package (1.8 mm thickness) that has been exposed to typical ambient air conditions for 72 hours longer than its floor life (168 hours) would need to perform a 27-hour bake at 120 °C before soldering but under the same ambient conditions using a VQFN-24, MSL 3 package (0.85 mm thickness) that user would have to perform an 8-hour bake at the same temperature. It is expected that the user solders the part within a few minutes to a few hours after bake and cool down completes, as the part will commence absorbing moisture again as soon as the package cools. Baking at temperatures between 90° and 120 °C is generally not recommended to exceed 96 hours over concerns of promoting oxidation and/or intermetallic growth, however, baking at temperatures under 90° has no practical time limit.

Once soldered, moisture sensitivity is generally no longer a consideration. This is because the MSL rating is concerned with the process of soldering or desoldering, which introduces relatively rapid high-temperature stress to the part. During normal use, including when power is applied, the plastic package is unlikely to encounter temperature conditions similar to soldering itself.

Though MSL standards are explicitly not meant to be applied during manual soldering and rework, manual rework temperature rise conditions may approach that of reflow soldering over a portion of, or the entire, package. The user should evaluate whether ignoring MSL bake conditions is appropriate in their circumstances.
