= Thin small outline package =

Thin surface mount IC package

An outline drawing of a Type I TSOP with 32 leads

Thin small outline package (TSOP) is a type of surface mount IC package. They are very low-profile (about 1 mm) and have tight lead spacing (as low as 0.5 mm).

They are frequently used for RAM or Flash memory ICs due to their high pin count and small volume. In some applications, they are being supplanted by ball grid array packages which can achieve even higher densities. The prime application for this technology is memory. SRAM, flash memory, FSRAM and EEPROM manufacturers find this package well suited to their end-use products. It answers the needs required by telecom, cellular, memory modules, PC cards (PCMCIA cards), wireless, netbooks and countless other product applications.

TSOP is the smallest leaded form factor for flash memory.

== History ==
The TSOP package was developed to fit the reduced package height available in a PCMCIA PC Card.

== Physical properties ==
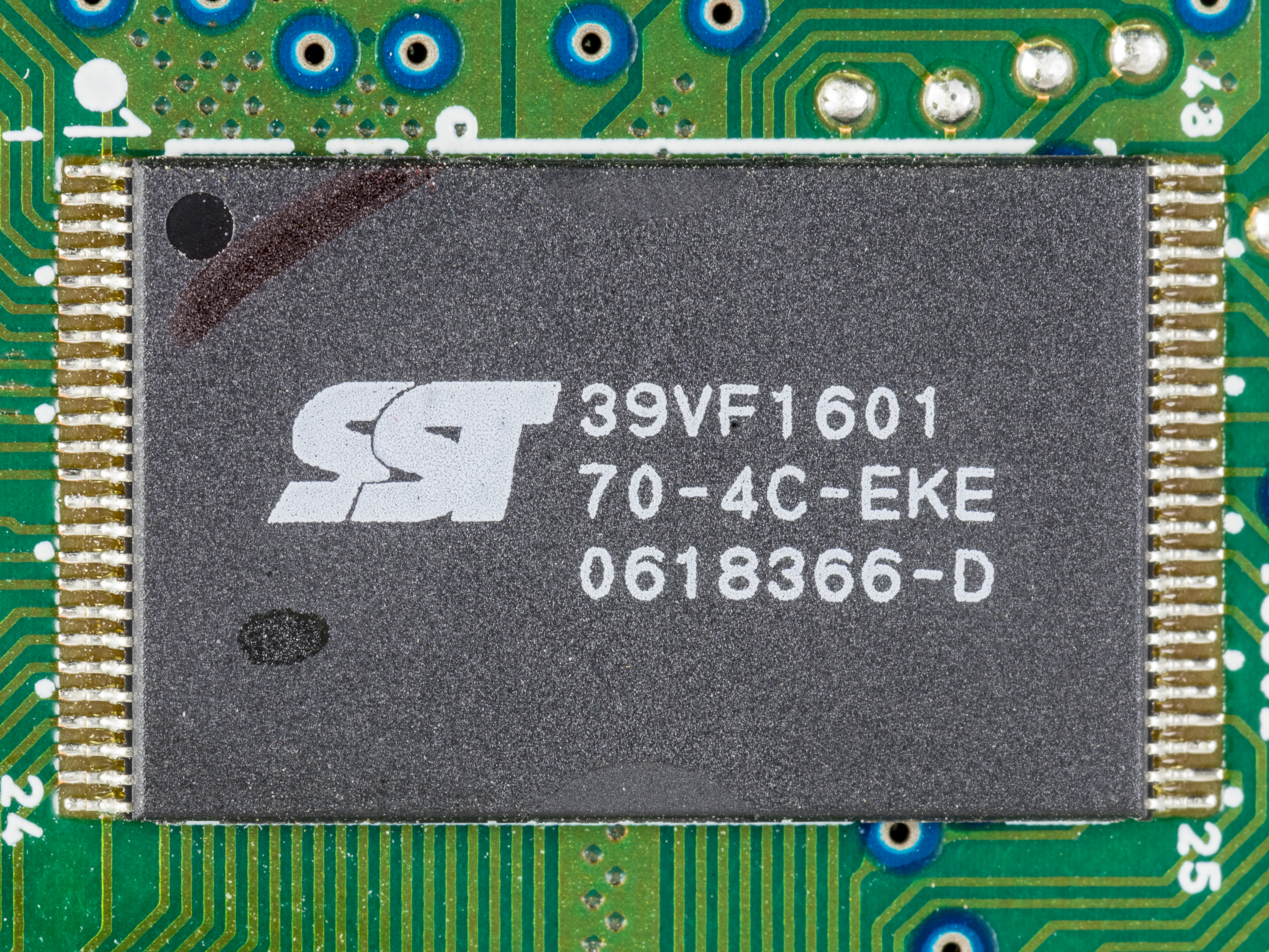
TSOP48 type I: Silicon Storage Technology 39F1601

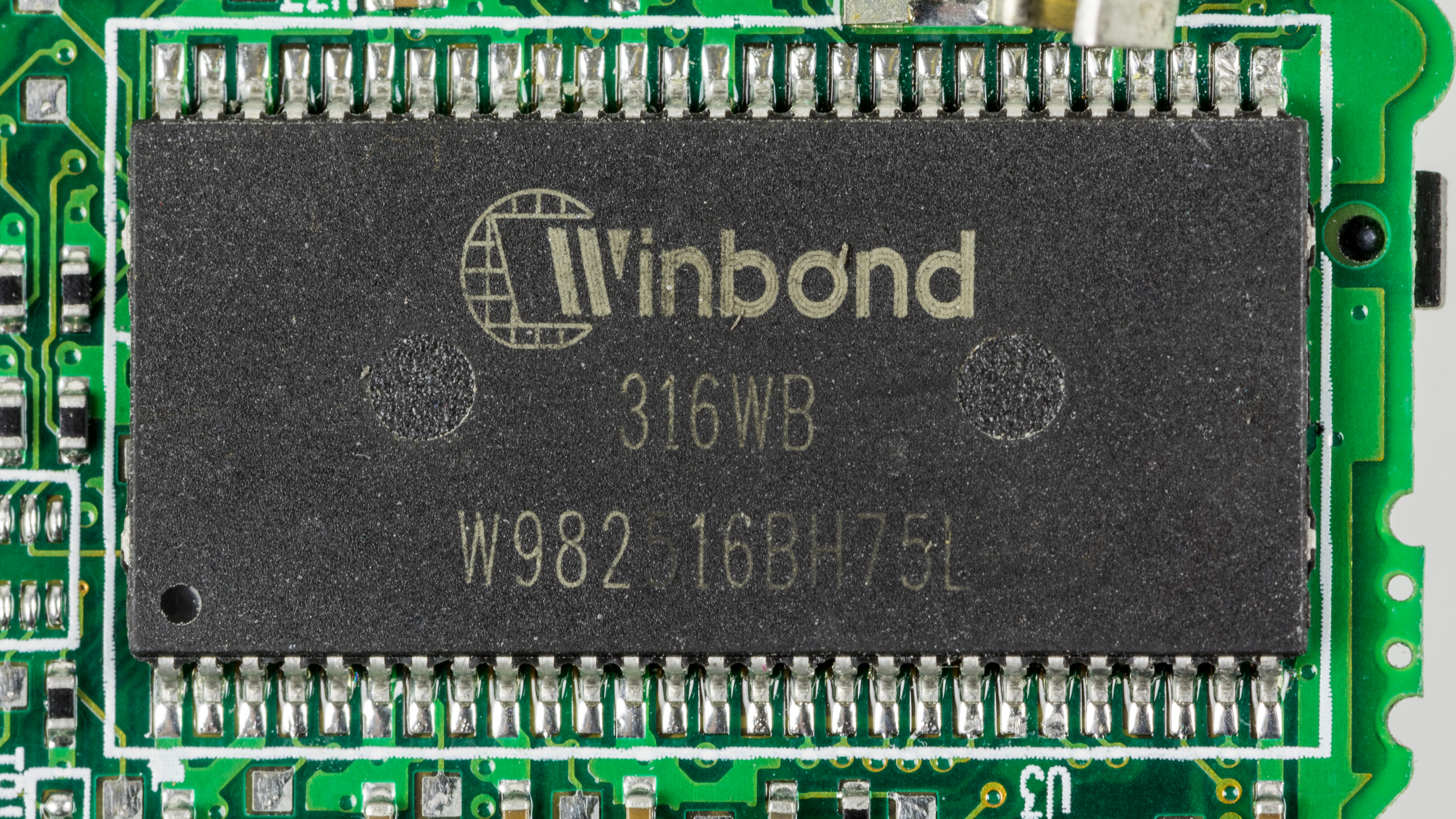
TSOP54 type 2 Winbond W982516BH75L

TSOPs are rectangular in shape and come in two varieties: Type I and Type II. Type I ICs have the pins on the shorter side and Type II have the pins on the longer side. The table below shows basic measurements for common TSOP packages.

=== Type I ===
| Part number | Pins | Body width (mm) | Body length (mm) | Lead pitch (mm) |
|---|---|---|---|---|
| TSOP28 | 28 | 8.1 | 11.8 | 0.55 |
| TSOP28/32 | 28/32 | 8 | 18.4 | 0.5 |
| TSOP40 | 40 | 10 | 18.4 | 0.5 |
| TSOP48 | 48 | 12 | 18.4 | 0.5 |
| TSOP56 | 56 | 14 | 18.4 | 0.5 |

=== Type II ===
| Part number | Pins | Body width (mm) | Body length (mm) | Lead pitch (mm) |
|---|---|---|---|---|
| TSOP6 (SOT457) | 6 | 1.5 | 2.9 | 0.95 |
| TSOP20/24/26 | 20/24/26 | 7.6 | 17.14 | 1.27 |
| TSOP24/28 | 24/28 | 10.16 | 18.41 | 1.27 |
| TSOP32 | 32 | 10.16 | 20.95 | 1.27 |
| TSOP40/44 | 40/44 | 10.16 | 18.42 | 0.8 |
| TSOP50 | 50 | 10.16 | 20.95 | 0.8 |
| TSOP54 | 54 | 10.16 | 22.22 | 0.8 |
| TSOP66 | 66 | 10.16 | 22.22 | 0.65 |

== HTSOP ==
HTSOP (Heatsink TSOP) is a variant of TSOP with an exposed pad on the bottom side. The pad is soldered to the PCB to transfer heat from the package to the PCB.

== Similar packages ==
There are a variety of small form-factor IC carrier available other than TSOPs

- Small-outline integrated circuit (SOIC)
- Plastic small-outline package (PSOP)
- Shrink small-outline package (SSOP)
- Thin-shrink small outline package (TSSOP)

== See also ==
- Integrated circuit
- Chip carrier Chip packaging and package types list
