= 2901 =

2901 may refer to:

- A member of the AMD Am2900 family of logic chips
- The first year of the 30th century
