= List of AMD Am2900 and Am29000 families =

Advanced Micro Devices (AMD) had a number of product lines with the part numbers beginning with "29". These families were generally not related to one another.

The Am29(F, BL, DL, DS)xxx family contains a variety of flash memories, and is not part of the Am2900/Am29000 families.

== Am2900 Family ==
The first such family is the Am2900 series of integrated circuits (ICs) created in 1975 designed in bit-slice topology so they could be used as modular components each representing a different aspect of a computer control unit (CCU). For details on the Am2900 Family see The Am2900 Family Data Book, by AMD.

== Am29xxx Family ==
The AMD Am29xxx series of chips are high performance processors and system building-block devices.

=== Am29000 ===
The Am29000 family are 32-bit RISC microprocessors. The Am29000 was a Berkeley RISC, register window design similar to the Sun SPARC.

- Am29000 32-bit RISC microprocessor, 4-stage Pipeline, 512-byte BTC (branch target cache)
- Am29005 32-bit RISC microprocessor with neither (functional) MMU nor BTC
- Am29027 Floating-point unit co-processor chip
- Am29030 32-bit RISC microprocessor with a 8K byte instruction cache
- Am29035 32-bit RISC microprocessor with a 4K byte instruction cache
- Am29040 32-bit RISC microprocessor with a 8K byte instruction cache, 4 KB data cache and hardware multiply
- Am29041 Data transfer controller
- Am29050 32-bit RISC microprocessor with FPU, 1kB BTC
- Am29062 Integrated cache unit with 8K bytes RAM

=== Am29100 Family ===
The Am29100 family are microcontrollers and their support chips. Most of the microcontrollers are 'intelligent', performing operations that would normally be performed by software.

- Am29101 16-bit Microprocessor Slice Circuit with Speed Select
- Am29111 Microprogram Sequencer Controller - For microprogram memory
- Am29112 High-performance 8-bit slice Microprogram Sequencer
- Am29114 Real-time 8-bit priority interrupt controller
- Am29116 High-performance 16-bit microprocessor
- Am29117 High-performance 16-bit microprocessor
- Am29118 8-bit I/O support unit for Am29116
- Am29130 16 to 30-bit shift register
- Am29141 Fuse programmable controller

=== Am29200 Family ===
The Am29200 family are processors intended for the high-end microcontroller market.

- Am29200 32-bit Microcontroller, internal ROM, DRAM interface, PIA/PIO/serial/Parallel/JTAG Ports
- Am29202 32-bit Microcontroller, internal ROM, DRAM interface, PIA/PIO/Serial/Parallel/JTAG Ports
- Am29205 32-bit Microcontroller, internal ROM, DRAM interface, PIA/PIO/Serial/Parallel Ports
- Am29240 32-bit Microcontroller, hardware multiply, internal ROM, DRAM interface, PIA/PIO/Serial/Parallel/JTAG ports
- Am29243 32-bit Microcontroller, hardware multiply, internal ROM, DRAM interface, PIA/PIO/Serial/Parallel/JTAG Ports
- Am29245 32-bit Microcontroller, internal ROM, DRAM interface, PIA/PIO/Serial/Parallel/JTAG Ports

=== Am29300 Family ===
The Am29300 family are 32-bit microprogrammable devices whose microcode is compatible with the earlier Am2900 series.

- Am29323 32-bit Parallel Multiplier
- Am29325 32-bit Floating-point unit
- Am29327 32-bit FPU
- Am29331 16-bit Microprogram Sequencer
- Am29332 64bit in, 32-bit out, ALU
- Am29334 Four-Port, Dual-Access Register File (SRAM)
- Am29337 16-bit Bounds Checker
- Am29338 32-bit Byte Queue,4 FIFOs
- Am29360 32-bit Error Detection and Correction Unit
- Am29368 1M-bit Dynamic Memory Controller (DMC)

=== Am29400 Family ===
The Am29400 family are ECL bit-slice components

- Am29433 32 x 32 Bit Floating-Point Multiplier, ECL-10K Logic
- Am29434 Register File, SRAM - Dual Port access, ECL-10K Logic

=== Am29500 Family ===
The Am29500 family are devices intended to build DSP-like functions.

- Am29501 Multi-Port Pipelined Processor for DSP
- Am29509 hardware multiplier 12x12
- Am29510 hardware multiplier 16x16, 32-bit answers through 16-bit input Pictures: AMD_AM29510DC.jpg
- Am29516 hardware multiplier 16x16, 32-bit answers through 16-bit input Pictures: AMD_AM29516DC.jpg
- Am29517 hardware multiplier 16x16, 32-bit answers through 16-bit input Pictures: AMD_AM29517DC.jpg AMD_AM29L517DC.jpg
- Am29520 Multilevel Pipe-Line Register
- Am29521 Multilevel Pipe-Line Register
- Am29524 Pipeline Register - Dual 7-Deep or Single 14-Deep
- Am29525 Pipeline Register - Dual 8-Deep or Single 16-Deep Pictures: AMD_AM29525DC.jpg
- Am29526 Sin/Cos generators via fast look up tables
- Am29527 Sin/Cos generators via fast look up tables
- Am29528 Sin/Cos generators via fast lookup tables
- Am29529 Sin/Cos generators via fast lookup tables
- Am29540 Sequence to produce addresses for FFT Computations

=== Am29600 Family ===
The Am29600 family are dynamic memory support devices.

- Am29660 CRC-Polynomial Error Circuit - Cascadable 64-bits of data, Pictures: Ic-photo-amd-AM29C660DJC.png
- Am29668 Dynamic Memory Controller - CDMC for 80386 interface
- Am29676 Memory Driver - 11-Bit DRAM Driver
- Am29688 Dynamic Memory Controller - CDMC for 80386 interface

=== Am29700 Family ===
The Am29700 family are fast memory devices.

- Am29700/701 Non-Inverting Schottky 64-Bit Random Access Memory (RAM)
- Am29702/703 Schottky 64-Bit RAM
- Am29705 16-Word by 4-Bit 2-Port RAM
- Am29707 Multi-Port SRAM
- Am29720/721 Low-Power Schottky 256-Bit RAM
- Am29750/Am29752 32-Word by 8-Bit Programmable Read-Only Memory (PROM)
- Am29754/Am29755 256-Word by 4-Bit PROM
- Am29770/Am29771 2048-Bit Generic Series Bipolar PROM
- Am29774/Am29775 4096-Bit Generic Series Bipolar PROM

=== Am29800 Family ===
The Am29800 family are bus interface chips and bit-slice support devices notable for in-circuit testing capability.

- Am29803 I/O Controller, 16-Way Branch Unit
- Am29806 6 bit Comparator/Decoder
- Am29809 9 bit Comparator
- Am29811 Next Address Control Unit
- Am29818 Pipeline register/diagnostic register
- Am29821 10-bit D flip-flop with Tri-State output
- Am29822 10-Bit D-Type Flip-Flop
- Am29823 9-Bit D-Type Flip-Flop with Tri-State output
- Am29824 9-Bit D-Type Flip-Flop with Tri-State output
- Am29825 8-Bit D Flip-Flop
- Am29826 8-BIT BUS INTERFACE FLIP-FLOPS WITH Tri-State OUTPUTS
- Am29827 10-Bit Buffers/Line Drivers
- Am29828 10-Bit Inverting Line Drivers
- Am29833 CMOS 9 bit PARITY BUS TRANSCEIVER
- Am29834 8-BIT TO 9-BIT PARITY BUS TRANSCEIVER
- Am29841 10-BIT Bus Interface Latches
- Am29842 10-BIT Bus Interface Latches
- Am29843 9-BIT Bus Interface Latches
- Am29844 9-Bit D-Type Latch
- Am29845 8-Bit Transparent Latch WITH Tri-State OUTPUTS
- Am29846 8-Bit BUS INTERFACE D-TYPE LATCHES, inverted outputs
- Am29853/Am29855 9-bit asynchronous parity transceiver
- Am29854 8-Bit TO 9-Bit Parity Bus Transceiver With Parity Generator/Checker; Parity-Error Flag With Open-Collector Output
- Am29861 10-BIT Bus Interface Transceiver
- Am29862 8-Bit Bus transceivers, Tri-State
- Am29863 9-BIT Bus transceivers, Tri-State, aka 74F863
- Am29864 9-BIT BUS TRANSCEIVER (Inverting)

=== Am29900 Family ===
The Am29900 family are bus interface chips.

- Am29921 10-Bit D-Type Flip-Flop
- Am29923 9-Bit D-Type Flip-Flop
- Am29925 Octal D-Type Latch - 3-state outputs with AND-gated enable
- Am29927 Non-Inverting-Function Buffer Gate
- Am29928 Inverting-Function Buffer Gate
- Am29933 Bus Transceiver - +9-bit parity tree
- Am29941 10-Bit D-Type Latch
- Am29943 9-Bit D-Type Latch
- Am29945 Octal D-Type Latch
- Am29953/Am29955 Bus Transceiver - +9-bit parity tree
- Am29961 Bus Transceiver - 10-bit, no buffer
- Am29963 Bus Transceiver - 9-bit, no buffer
- Am29982 Bus Controller - 4x4-port multiple bus exchange
- Am29983/Am19985 Bus Controller - 9x4-port multiple bus exchange

== See also ==
- AMD
- AMD Am2900
- AMD Am29000
- Bit-slice
