= Motorola MC10800 =

Family of microcontrollers

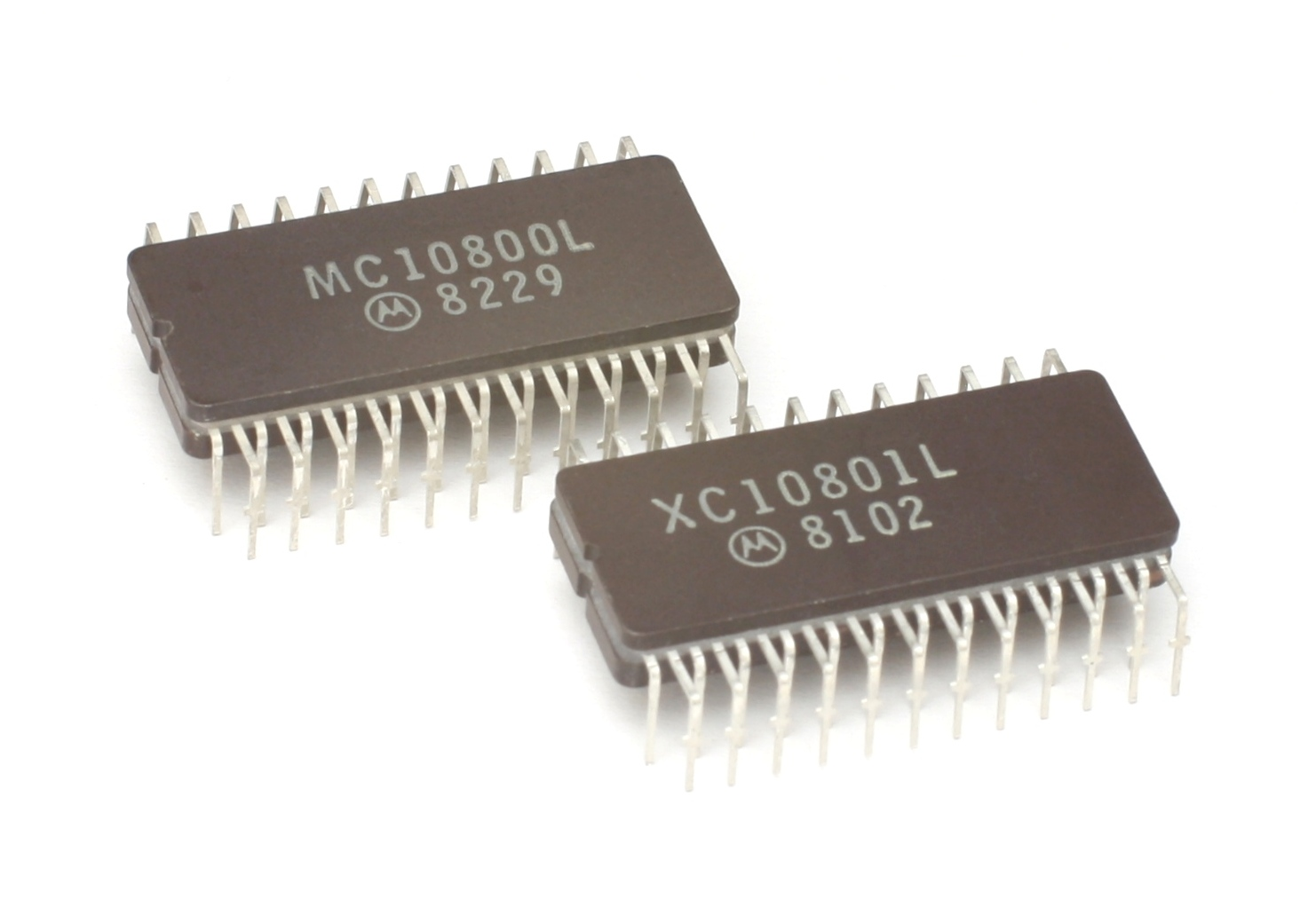
MC10800 family in Quad in-line packages

The Motorola MC10800 is a 4-bit bit-sliced processor designed by Motorola and introduced in 1979. It is implemented in ECL logic and is part of the M10800 family.

A clone of the MC10800 was manufactured in the Soviet Union under the designation K1800VS1 (Russian: К1800ВС1). The Soviet 1800 series included other members of the M10800 and M10900 families as well.
