= Advanced Technology Airborne Computer =

Computer used by the US Navy and NASA

The Advanced Technology Airborne Computer (ATAC) was a product of Itek (a division of Litton Industries), used on US naval aircraft, and the NASA Galileo (spacecraft).

The ATAC was built using AMD 2901 4-bit processors and had a basic cycle time of 250 ns. It could be programmed in HAL/S, and could be microprogrammed to add new instructions. The Galileo project added four instructions.

== Use by Galileo project ==
The Galileo Attitude and Articulation Control System (AACSE) was controlled by two Itek Advanced Technology Airborne Computers (ATAC), built using radiation-hardened 2901s. The project wrote their own GRACOS (Galileo realtime Attitude Control Operating System).

The Galileo project had radiation-hardened 2901 processors made (by Sandia National Lab) for the spacecraft.
