= Galileo (spacecraft) =

First NASA mission to orbit Jupiter (1989–2003)

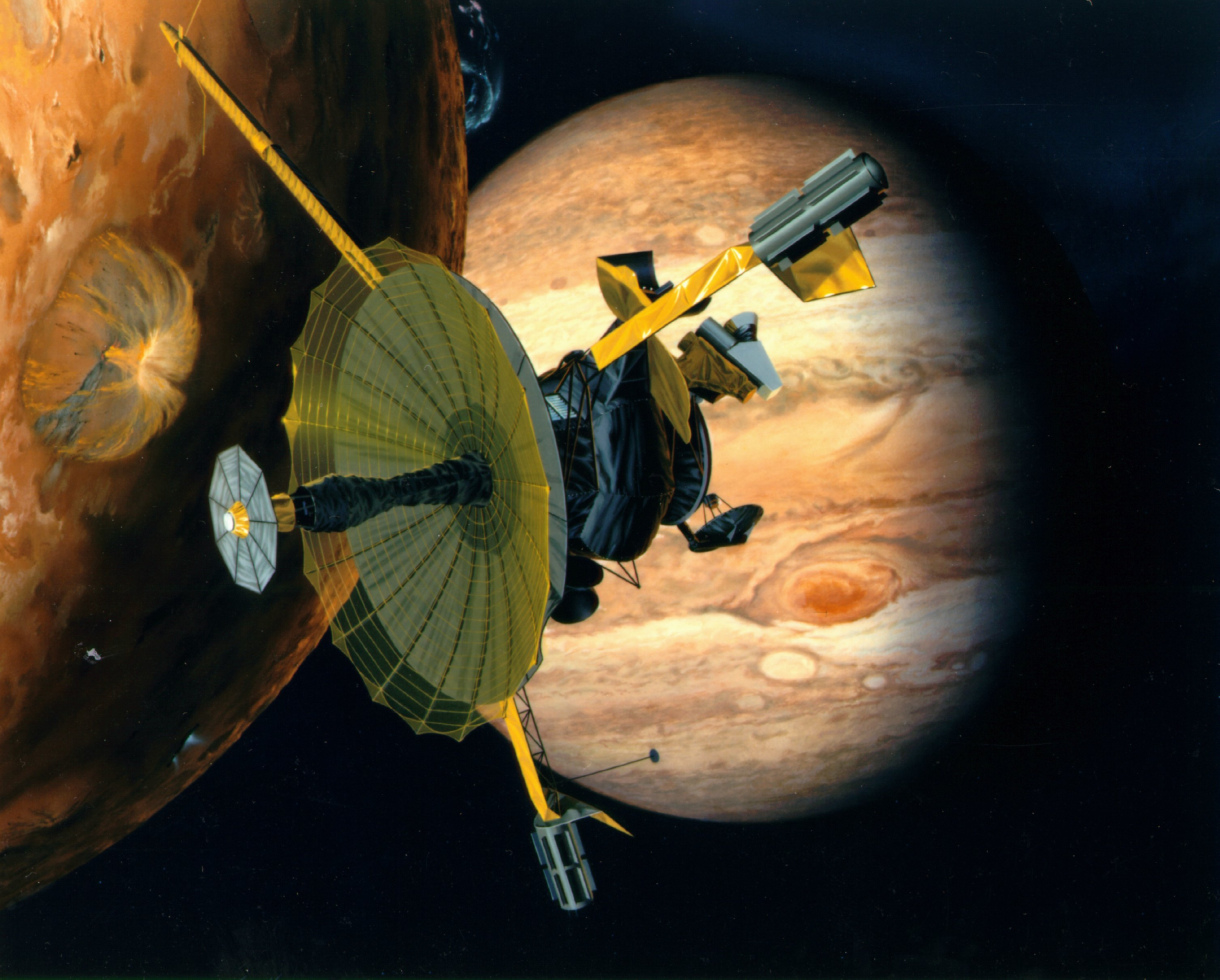
- Artist's concept of Galileo at Io with Jupiter in the background. In reality, the high-gain foldable antenna failed to deploy in flight.
- Names: Jupiter Orbiter Probe
- Mission type: Jupiter orbiter
- Operator: NASA
- COSPAR ID: 1989-084B
- SATCAT no.: 20298
- Website: solarsystem.nasa.gov/galileo/
- Mission duration: Planned: 8 years, 1 month, 19 days; Jupiter orbit: 7 years, 9 months, 13 days; Final: 13 years, 11 months, 3 days
- Distance travelled: 4,631,778,000 km (2.88 billion mi)

Spacecraft properties
- Manufacturer: Jet Propulsion Laboratory; Messerschmitt-Bölkow-Blohm; General Electric; Hughes Aircraft Company
- Launch mass: Total: 2,560 kg (5,640 lb); Orbiter: 2,220 kg (4,890 lb); Probe: 340 kg (750 lb)
- Dry mass: Orbiter: 1,880 kg (4,140 lb); Probe: 340 kg (750 lb)
- Payload mass: Orbiter: 118 kg (260 lb); Probe: 30 kg (66 lb)
- Power: Orbiter: 570 watts at launch, 493 watts on arrival, 410 watts at end-of-life; Probe: 730 watt-hours

Start of mission
- Launch date: October 18, 1989, 16:53:40 UTC
- Rocket: Space Shuttle Atlantis; STS-34/IUS
- Launch site: Kennedy LC-39B
- Entered service: December 8, 1995, 01:16 UTC SCET

End of mission
- Disposal: Controlled entry into Jupiter
- Decay date: September 21, 2003, 18:57:18 UTC
Instruments
- SSI: Solid-State Imager
- NIMS: Near-Infrared Mapping Spectrometer
- UVS: Ultraviolet Spectrometer
- PPR: Photopolarimeter-Radiometer
- DDS: Dust Detector Subsystem
- EPD: Energetic Particles Detector
- HIC: Heavy Ion Counter
- MAG: Magnetometer
- PLS: Plasma Subsystem
- PWS: Plasma Wave Subsystem
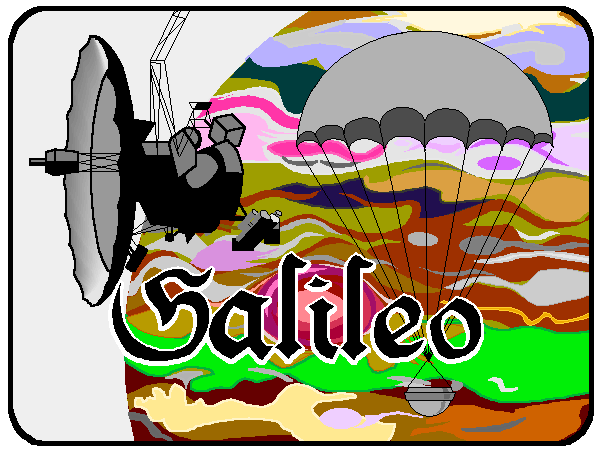
- Large Strategic Science Missions; Planetary Science Division

Galileo was an American robotic space probe that studied the planet Jupiter and its moons, as well as the asteroids Gaspra and Ida. Named after the Italian astronomer Galileo Galilei, it consisted of an orbiter and an entry probe. It was delivered into Earth orbit on October 18, 1989, by Space Shuttle Atlantis, during STS-34. Galileo arrived at Jupiter on December 7, 1995, after gravitational assist flybys of Venus and Earth, and became the first spacecraft to orbit an outer planet.

The Jet Propulsion Laboratory built the Galileo spacecraft and managed the Galileo program for NASA. West Germany's Messerschmitt-Bölkow-Blohm supplied the propulsion module. NASA's Ames Research Center managed the atmospheric probe, which was built by Hughes Aircraft Company. At launch, the orbiter and probe together had a mass of 2,562 kg (5,648 lb) and stood 6.15 m (20.2 ft) tall.

Spacecraft are normally stabilized either by spinning around a fixed axis or by maintaining a fixed orientation with reference to the Sun and a star. Galileo did both. One section of the spacecraft rotated at three revolutions per minute, keeping Galileo stable and holding six instruments that gathered data from many different directions, including the fields and particles instruments.

Galileo was intentionally destroyed in Jupiter's atmosphere on September 21, 2003 to prevent it from contaminating any of Jupiter's moons. The next orbiter to be sent to Jupiter was Juno, which arrived on July 5, 2016.

== Development ==
Jupiter is the largest planet in the Solar System, with more than twice the mass of all the other planets combined. Consideration of sending a probe to Jupiter began as early as 1959. NASA's Scientific Advisory Group (SAG) for Outer Solar System Missions considered the requirements for Jupiter orbiters and atmospheric probes. It noted that the technology to build a heat shield for an atmospheric probe did not yet exist, and facilities to test one under the conditions found on Jupiter would not be available until 1980. NASA management designated the Jet Propulsion Laboratory (JPL) as the lead center for the Jupiter Orbiter Probe (JOP) project. The JOP would be the fifth spacecraft to visit Jupiter, but the first to orbit it, and the probe would be the first to enter its atmosphere.

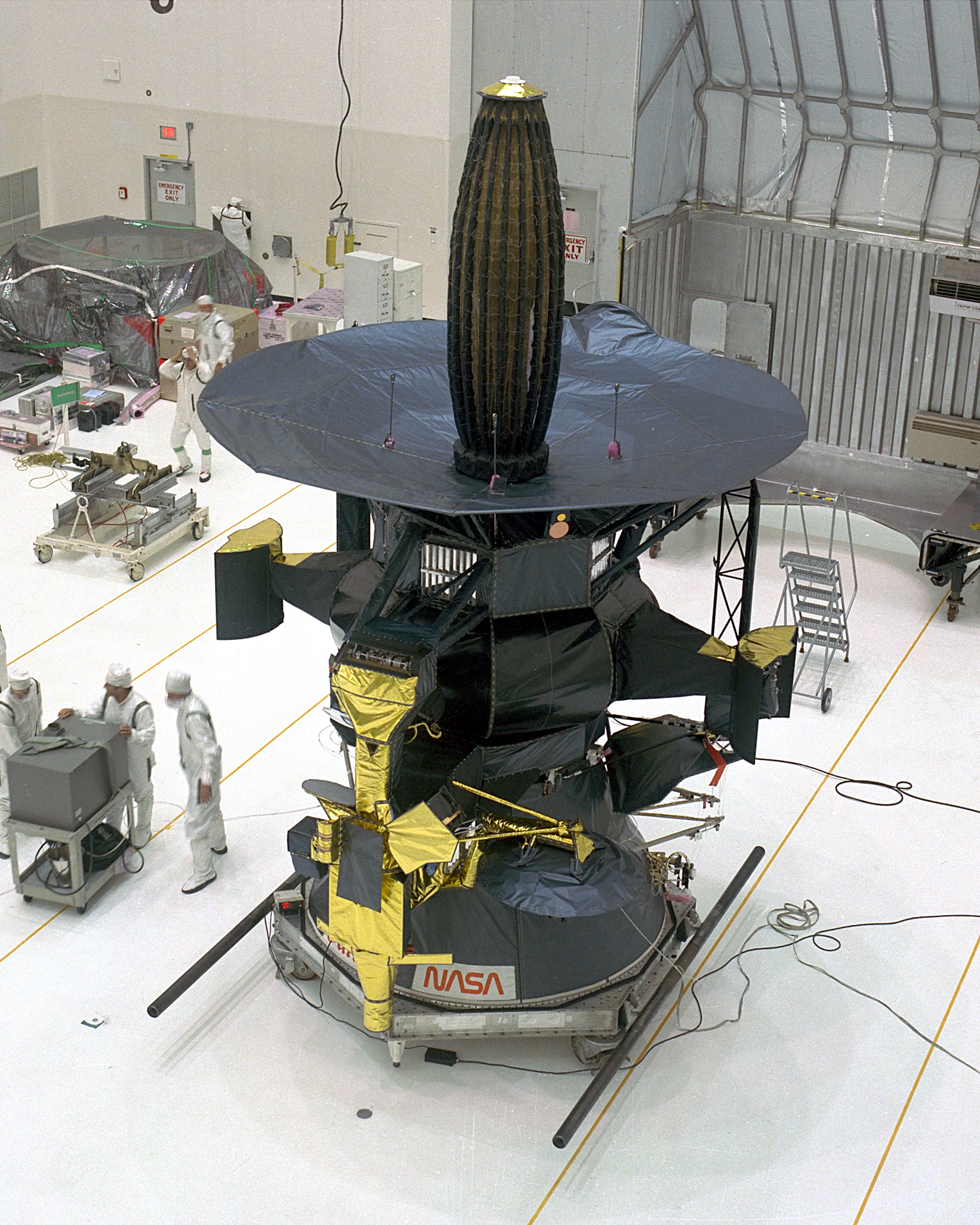
In the Vertical Processing Facility (VPF), Galileo is prepared for mating with the Inertial Upper Stage booster.

An important decision made at this time was to use a Mariner program spacecraft like that used for Voyager for the Jupiter orbiter, rather than a Pioneer. Pioneer was stabilized by spinning the spacecraft at 60 rpm, which gave a 360-degree view of the surroundings, and did not require an attitude control system. In contrast, Mariner had an attitude control system with three gyroscopes and two sets of six nitrogen jet thrusters. Attitude was determined with reference to the Sun and Canopus, which were monitored with two primary and four secondary sensors. There was also an inertial reference unit and an accelerometer. This allowed it to take high-resolution images, but the functionality came at a cost of increased weight. A Mariner weighed 722 kilograms (1,592 lb) compared to just 146 kilograms (322 lb) for a Pioneer.

John R. Casani, who had headed the Mariner and Voyager projects, became the first project manager. He solicited suggestions for a more inspirational name for the project, and the most votes went to "Galileo" after Galileo Galilei, the first person to view Jupiter through a telescope. His 1610 discovery of what is now known as the Galilean moons orbiting Jupiter was important evidence of the Copernican model of the solar system. It was also noted that the name was that of a spacecraft in the Star Trek television show. The new name was officially adopted in February 1978.

The Jet Propulsion Laboratory built the Galileo spacecraft with an octagonal prism bus and managed the Galileo mission for NASA. West Germany's Messerschmitt-Bölkow-Blohm supplied the propulsion module. NASA's Ames Research Center managed the cone-shaped atmospheric probe, which was built by the Hughes Aircraft Company. At launch, the orbiter and probe together had a mass of 2,562 kg (5,648 lb) and stood 6.15 m (20.2 ft) tall. Spacecraft are normally stabilized either by spinning around a fixed axis or by maintaining a fixed orientation with reference the Sun and a star; Galileo did both. One section of the spacecraft rotated at 3 revolutions per minute, keeping Galileo stable and holding six instruments that gathered data from many different directions, including the fields and particles instruments. Back on the ground, the mission operations team used software containing 650,000 lines of code in the orbit sequence design process; 1,615,000 lines in the telemetry interpretation; and 550,000 lines of code in navigation. All of the spacecraft components and spare parts received a minimum of 2,000 hours of testing. The spacecraft was designed to last for at least five years—long enough to reach Jupiter and perform its mission.

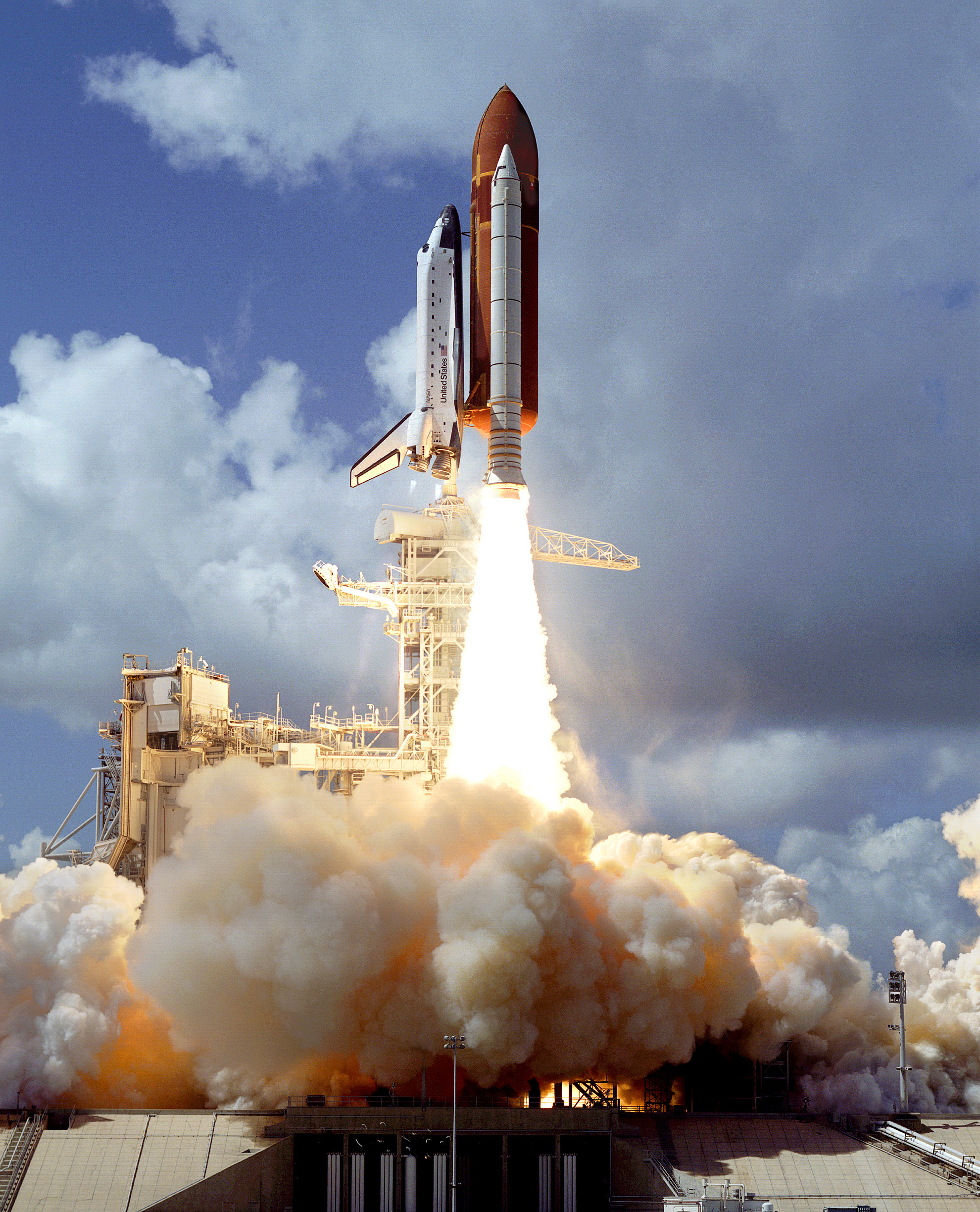
Launch of Space Shuttle Atlantis on STS-34, carrying Galileo into Earth orbit

On December 19, 1985, it departed the JPL in Pasadena, California, on the first leg of its journey, a road trip to the Kennedy Space Center in Florida. Due to the Space Shuttle Challenger disaster, the May launch date could not be met, and the mission was rescheduled to October 12, 1989. The Galileo spacecraft would be launched by the STS-34 mission in the Space Shuttle Atlantis. As the launch date of Galileo neared, anti-nuclear groups, concerned over what they perceived as an unacceptable risk to the public's safety from the plutonium in the Galileo's radioisotope thermoelectric generators (RTGs) and General Purpose Heat Source (GPHS) modules, sought a court injunction prohibiting Galileo's launch. RTGs were necessary for deep space probes because they had to fly distances from the Sun that made the use of solar energy impractical.

The launch was delayed twice more: by a faulty main engine controller that forced a postponement to October 17, and then by inclement weather, which necessitated a postponement to the following day, but this was not a concern since the launch window extended until November 21. Atlantis finally lifted off at 16:53:40 UTC on October 18, and went into a 343-kilometer (213 mi) orbit. Galileo was successfully deployed at 00:15 UTC on October 19. Following the IUS burn, the Galileo spacecraft adopted its configuration for solo flight, and separated from the IUS at 01:06:53 UTC on October 19. The launch was perfect, and Galileo was soon headed towards Venus at over 14,000 km/h (9,000 mph). Atlantis returned to Earth safely on October 23.

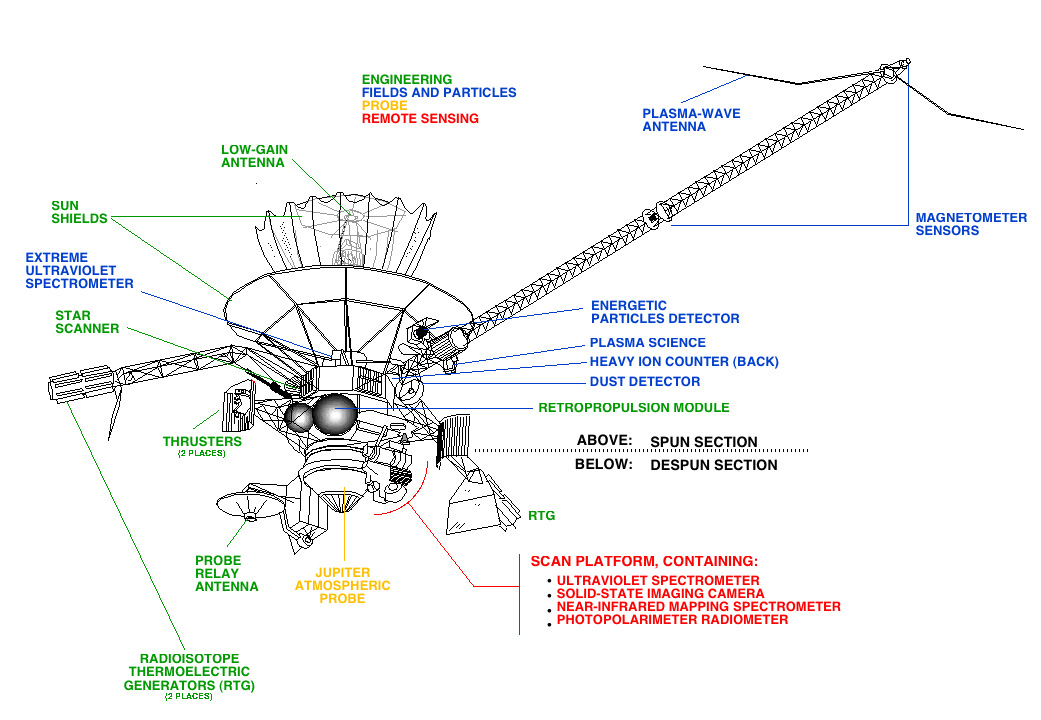
Galileo's main components

== Command and Data Handling (CDH) ==
The CDH subsystem was actively redundant, with two parallel data system buses running at all times. Each data system bus (a.k.a. string) was composed of the same functional elements, consisting of multiplexers (MUX), high-level modules (HLM), low-level modules (LLM), power converters (PC), bulk memory (BUM), data management subsystem bulk memory (DBUM), timing chains (TC), phase locked loops (PLL), Golay coders (GC), hardware command decoders (HCD) and critical controllers (CRC).

The CDH subsystem was responsible for maintaining the following functions:

1. decoding of uplink commands
2. execution of commands and sequences
3. execution of system-level fault-protection responses
4. collection, processing, and formatting of telemetry data for downlink transmission
5. movement of data between subsystems via a data system bus.

The spacecraft was controlled by six RCA 1802 COSMAC microprocessor CPUs: four on the spun side and two on the despun side. Each CPU was clocked at about 1.6 MHz, and fabricated on sapphire (silicon on sapphire), which is a radiation-and static-hardened material ideal for spacecraft operation. This 8-bit microprocessor was the first low-power CMOS processor chip, similar to the 6502 that was being built into the Apple II desktop computer at that time.

The Galileo Attitude and Articulation Control System (AACSE) was controlled by two Itek Advanced Technology Airborne Computers (ATAC), built using radiation-hardened 2901s. The AACSE could be reprogrammed in flight by sending the new program through the Command and Data Subsystem. The attitude control system software was written in the HAL/S programming language, which was also used in the Space Shuttle program.

Memory capacity provided by each BUM was 16K of RAM, while the DBUMs each provided 8K of RAM. There were two BUMs and two DBUMs in the CDH subsystem and they all resided on the spun side of the spacecraft. The BUMs and DBUMs provided storage for sequences and contain various buffers for telemetry data and interbus communication. Every HLM and LLM was built up around a single 1802 microprocessor and 32K of RAM (for HLMs) or 16K of RAM (for LLMs). Two HLMs and two LLMs resided on the spun side while two LLMs were on the despun side. Thus, total memory capacity available to the CDH subsystem was 176K of RAM: 144K allocated to the spun side and 32K to the despun side. Each HLM was responsible for the following functions:

1. uplink command processing
2. maintenance of the spacecraft clock
3. movement of data over the data system bus
4. execution of stored sequences (time-event tables)
5. telemetry control
6. error recovery including system fault-protection monitoring and response.

Each LLM was responsible for the following functions:

1. collect and format engineering data from the subsystems
2. provide the capability to issue coded and discrete commands to spacecraft users
3. recognize out-of-tolerance conditions on status inputs
4. perform some system fault-protection functions.

== Propulsion ==
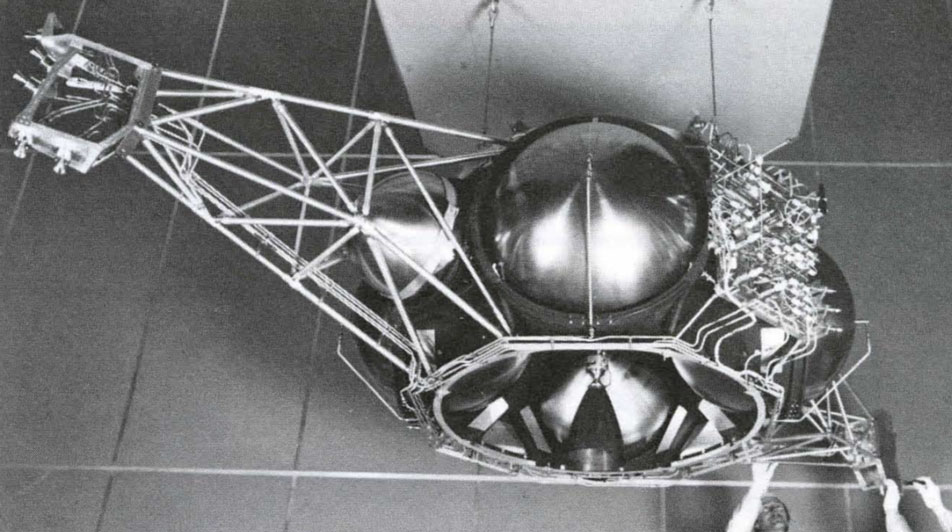
Propulsion module

The propulsion subsystem consisted of a 400 N (90 lbf) main engine and twelve 10 N (2.2 lbf) thrusters, together with propellant, storage and pressurizing tanks and associated plumbing. The 10 N thrusters were mounted in groups of six on two 2-meter (6.6 ft) booms. The fuel for the system was 925 kg (2,039 lb) of monomethylhydrazine and nitrogen tetroxide. Two separate tanks held another 7 kg (15 lb) of helium pressurant. The propulsion subsystem was developed and built by Messerschmitt-Bölkow-Blohm and provided by West Germany, the major international partner in Project Galileo.

== Electrical power ==
At the time, solar panels were not practical at Jupiter's distance from the Sun; the spacecraft would have needed a minimum of 65 square meters (700 sq ft) of panels. Chemical batteries would likewise be prohibitively large due to technological limitations. The solution was two radioisotope thermoelectric generators (RTGs) which powered the spacecraft through the radioactive decay of plutonium-238. The heat emitted by this decay was converted into electricity through the solid-state Seebeck effect. This provided a reliable and long-lasting source of electricity unaffected by the cold environment and high-radiation fields in the Jovian system.

Each GPHS-RTG, mounted on a 5-meter-long (16 ft) boom, carried 7.8 kilograms (17 lb) of ^{238}Pu. Each RTG contained 18 separate heat source modules, and each module encased four pellets of plutonium(IV) oxide, a ceramic material resistant to fracturing. The plutonium was enriched to about 83.5 percent plutonium-238. The modules were designed to survive a range of potential accidents: launch vehicle explosion or fire, re-entry into the atmosphere followed by land or water impact, and post-impact situations. An outer covering of graphite provided protection against the structural, thermal, and eroding environments of a potential re-entry into Earth's atmosphere. Additional graphite components provided impact protection, while iridium cladding of the RTGs provided post-impact containment. The RTGs produced about 570 watts at launch. The power output initially decreased at the rate of 0.6 watts per month and was 493 watts when Galileo arrived at Jupiter.

== Telecommunications ==
The spacecraft had a large high-gain antenna which failed to deploy during the mission, so the low-gain antenna was used instead, limiting data transfer to slower bit rates.

== Instruments ==
Scientific instruments to measure fields and particles were mounted on the spinning section of the spacecraft, together with the main antenna, power supply, the propulsion module and most of Galileo's computers and control electronics. The sixteen instruments, weighing 118 kg (260 lb) altogether, included magnetometer sensors mounted on an 11 m (36 ft) boom to minimize interference from the spacecraft; a plasma instrument for detecting low-energy charged particles and a plasma-wave detector to study waves generated by the particles; a high-energy particle detector; and a detector of cosmic and Jovian dust. It also carried the Heavy Ion Counter, an engineering experiment to assess the potentially hazardous charged particle environments the spacecraft flew through, and an extreme ultraviolet detector associated with the UV spectrometer on the scan platform.

The despun section's instruments included the camera system; the near infrared mapping spectrometer to make multi-spectral images for atmospheric and moon surface chemical analysis; the ultraviolet spectrometer to study gases; and the photopolarimeter-radiometer to measure radiant and reflected energy. The camera system was designed to obtain images of Jupiter's satellites at resolutions 20 to 1,000 times better than Voyager's best, because Galileo flew closer to the planet and its inner moons, and because the more modern CCD sensor in Galileo's camera was more sensitive and had a broader color detection band than the vidicons of Voyager.

=== Despun section ===
==== Solid-state imager (SSI) ====
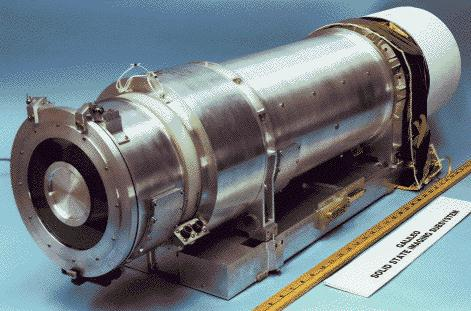
Solid-state imager

The SSI was an 800-by-800-pixel charge-coupled device (CCD) camera. The optical portion of the camera was a modified flight spare of the Voyager narrow-angle camera; a Cassegrain telescope. The CCD had radiation shielding a 10 mm (0.4 in) thick layer of tantalum surrounding the CCD except where the light enters the system. An eight-position filter wheel was used to obtain images at specific wavelengths. The images were then combined electronically on Earth to produce color images. The spectral response of the SSI ranged from about 400 to 1100 nm. The SSI weighed 29.7 kg (65 lb) and consumed, on average, 15 watts of power.

==== Near-infrared mapping spectrometer (NIMS) ====
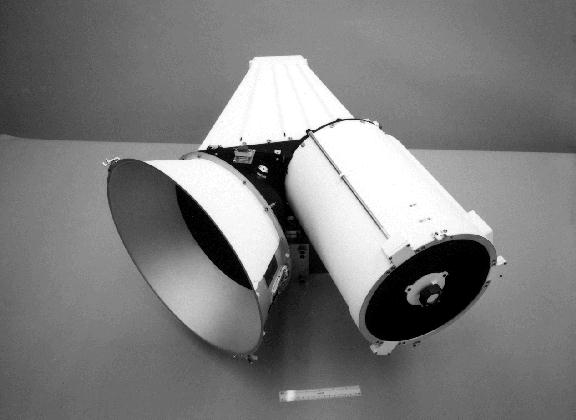
Near-infrared mapping spectrometer

The NIMS instrument was sensitive to 0.7-to-5.2-micrometer wavelength infrared light, overlapping the wavelength range of the SSI. NIMS used a 229 mm (9 in) aperture reflecting telescope. The spectrometer used a grating to disperse the light collected by the telescope. The dispersed spectrum of light was focused on detectors of indium, antimonide and silicon. NIMS weighed 18 kg (40 lb) and used 12 watts of power on average.

==== Ultraviolet spectrometer / extreme ultraviolet spectrometer (UVS/EUV) ====
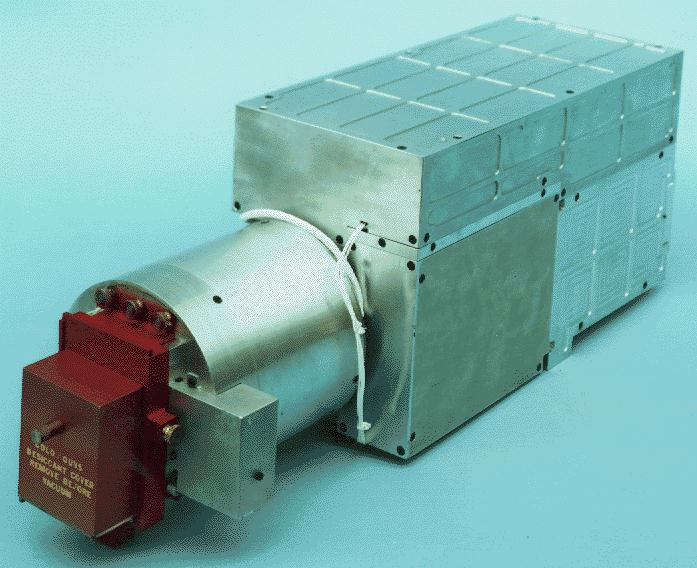
Ultraviolet spectrometer

The Cassegrain telescope of the UVS had a 250 mm (9.8 in) aperture. Both the UVS and EUV instruments used a ruled grating to disperse light for spectral analysis. Light then passed through an exit slit into photomultiplier tubes that produced pulses of electrons, which were counted and the results sent to Earth. The UVS was mounted on Galileo's scan platform. The EUV was mounted on the spun section. As Galileo rotated, EUV observed a narrow ribbon of space perpendicular to the spin axis. The two instruments combined weighed about 9.7 kg (21 lb) and used 5.9 watts of power.

==== Photopolarimeter–radiometer (PPR) ====
The PPR had seven radiometry bands. One of these used no filters and observed all incoming radiation, both solar and thermal. Another band allowed only solar radiation through. The difference between the solar-plus-thermal and the solar-only channels gave the total thermal radiation emitted. The PPR also measured in five broadband channels that spanned the spectral range from 17 to 110 micrometers. The radiometer provided data on the temperatures of Jupiter's atmosphere and satellites. The design of the instrument was based on that of an instrument flown on the Pioneer Venus spacecraft. A 100 mm (4 in) aperture reflecting telescope collected light and directed it to a series of filters, and, from there, measurements were performed by the detectors of the PPR. The PPR weighed 5.0 kg (11.0 lb) and consumed about 5 watts of power.

=== Spun section ===
==== Dust-detector subsystem (DDS) ====
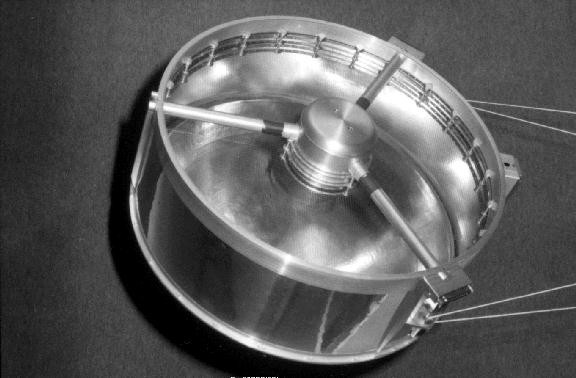
Dust-detector subsystem

The dust-detector subsystem (DDS) was used to measure the mass, electric charge, and velocity of incoming particles. The masses of dust particles that the DDS could detect go from 10^{−16} to 10^{−7} grams. The speed of these small particles could be measured over the range of 1 to 70 kilometers per second (0.6 to 43.5 mi/s). The instrument could measure impact rates from 1 particle per 115 days (10 megaseconds) to 100 particles per second. Such data was used to help determine dust origin and dynamics within the magnetosphere. The DDS weighed 4.2 kg (9.3 lb) and used an average of 5.4 watts of power.

==== Energetic-particles detector (EPD) ====
The energetic-particles detector (EPD) was designed to measure the numbers and energies of ions and electrons whose energies exceeded about 20 keV (3.2 fJ). The EPD could also measure the direction of travel of such particles and, in the case of ions, could determine their composition (whether the ion is oxygen or sulfur, for example). The EPD used silicon solid-state detectors and a time-of-flight detector system to measure changes in the energetic particle population at Jupiter as a function of position and time. These measurements helped determine how the particles got their energy and how they were transported through Jupiter's magnetosphere. The EPD weighed 10.5 kg (23 lb) and used 10.1 watts of power on average.

==== Heavy-ion counter (HIC) ====
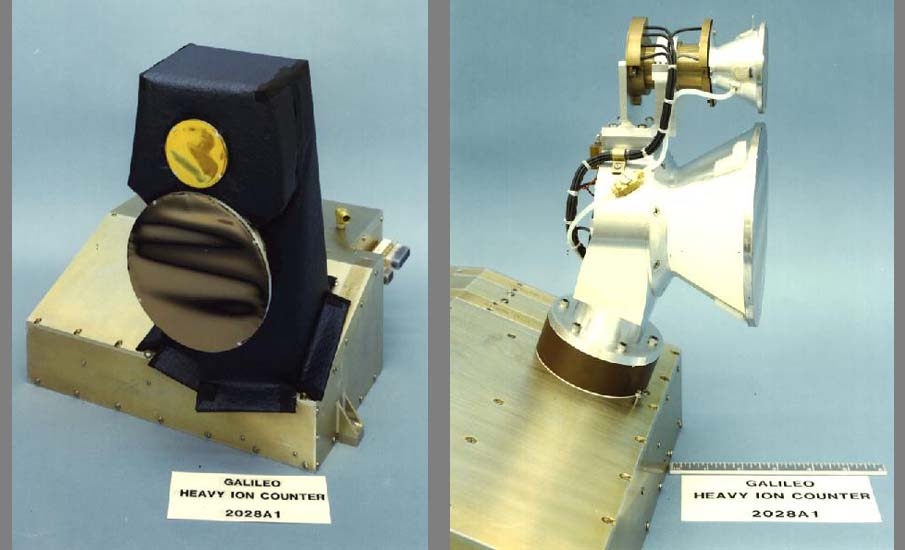
Heavy-ion counter

The HIC was, in effect, a repackaged and updated version of some parts of the flight spare of the Voyager cosmic-ray system. The HIC detected heavy ions using stacks of single crystal silicon wafers. The HIC could measure heavy ions with energies as low as 6 MeV (1 pJ) and as high as 200 MeV (32 pJ) per nucleon. This range included all atomic substances between carbon and nickel. The HIC and the EUV shared a communications link and, therefore, had to share observing time. The HIC weighed 8.0 kg (17.6 lb) and used an average of 2.8 watts of power.

==== Magnetometer (MAG) ====
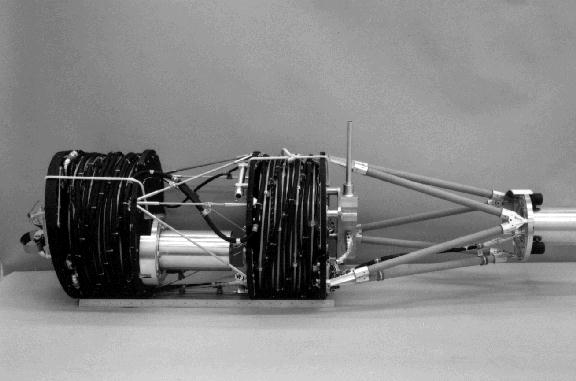
Magnetometer (stowed)

The magnetometer (MAG) used two sets of three sensors. The three sensors allowed the three orthogonal components of the magnetic field section to be measured. One set was located at the end of the magnetometer boom and, in that position, was about 11 m (36 ft) from the spin axis of the spacecraft. The second set, designed to detect stronger fields, was 6.7 m (22 ft) from the spin axis. The boom was used to remove the MAG from the immediate vicinity of Galileo to minimize magnetic effects from the spacecraft. However, not all these effects could be eliminated by distancing the instrument. The rotation of the spacecraft was used to separate natural magnetic fields from engineering-induced fields. Another source of potential error in measurement came from the bending and twisting of the long magnetometer boom. To account for these motions, a calibration coil was mounted rigidly on the spacecraft to generate a reference magnetic field during calibrations. The magnetic field at the surface of the Earth has a strength of about 50,000 nT. At Jupiter, the outboard (11 m) set of sensors could measure magnetic field strengths in the range from ±32 to ±512 nT, while the inboard (6.7 m) set was active in the range from ±512 to ±16,384 nT. The MAG experiment weighed 7.0 kg (15.4 lb) and used 3.9 watts of power.

==== Plasma subsystem (PLS) ====
The PLS used seven fields of view to collect charged particles for energy and mass analysis. These fields of view covered most angles from 0 to 180 degrees, fanning out from the spin axis. The rotation of the spacecraft carried each field of view through a full circle. The PLS measured particles in the energy range from 0.9 to 52,000 eV (0.14 to 8,300 aJ). The PLS weighed 13.2 kg (29 lb) and used an average of 10.7 watts of power.

==== Plasma-wave subsystem (PWS) ====
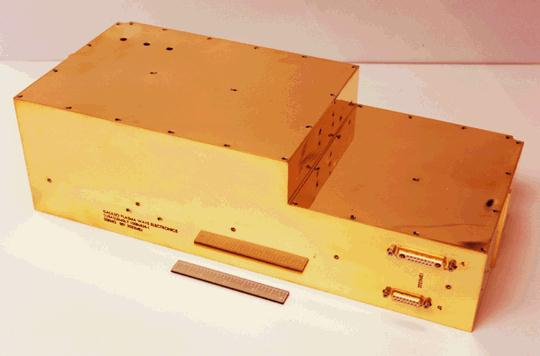
Plasma-wave subsystem

An electric dipole antenna was used to study the electric fields of plasmas, while two search coil magnetic antennas studied the magnetic fields. The electric dipole antenna was mounted at the tip of the magnetometer boom. The search coil magnetic antennas were mounted on the high-gain antenna feed. Nearly simultaneous measurements of the electric and magnetic field spectrum allowed electrostatic waves to be distinguished from electromagnetic waves. The PWS weighed 7.1 kg (16 lb) and used an average of 9.8 watts.

== Galileo entry probe ==
Galileo Probe
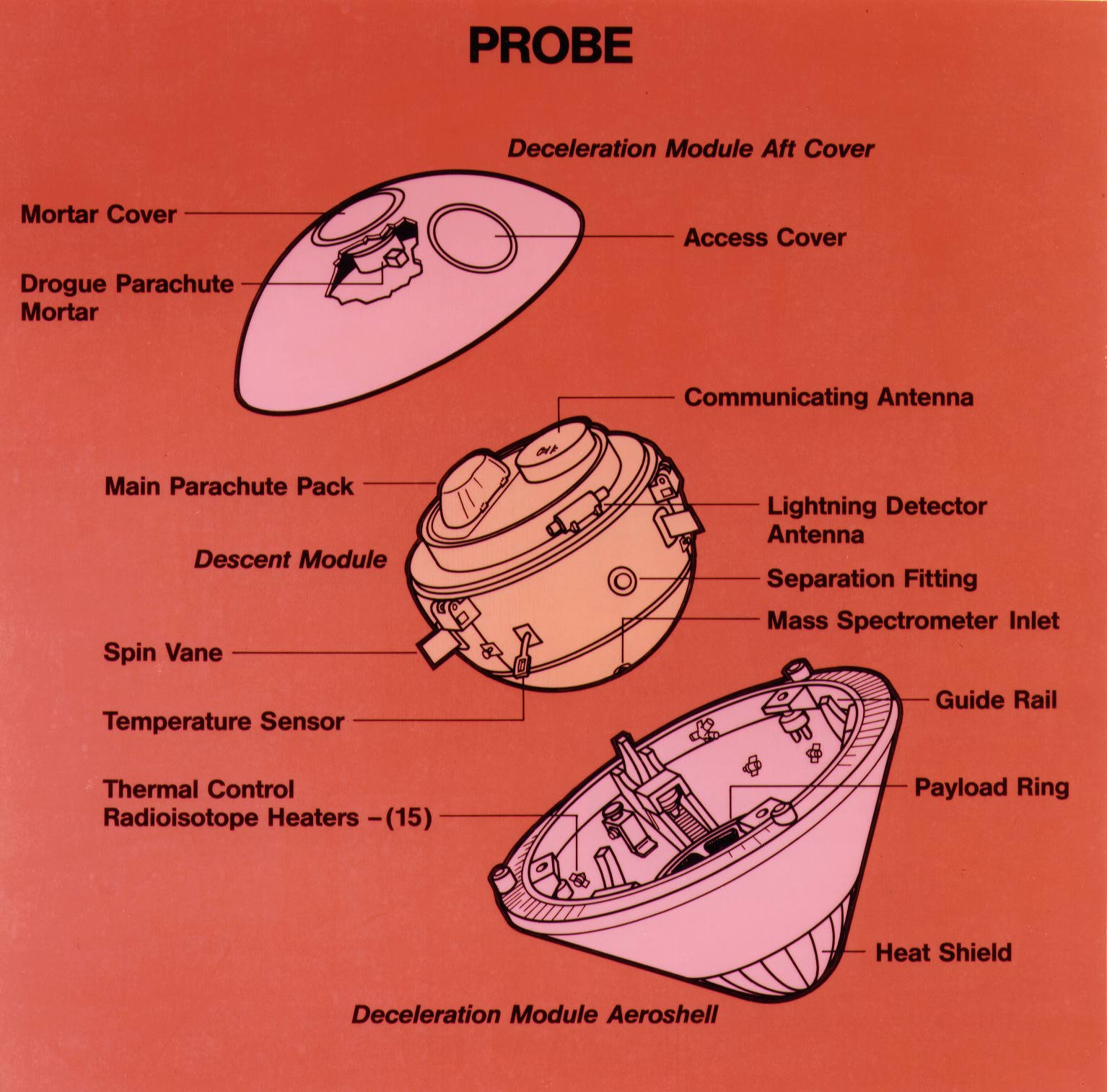
- Diagram of the atmospheric entry probe's instruments and subsystems
- Mission type: Atmospheric probe
- Operator: NASA
- COSPAR ID: 1989-084E
- SATCAT no.: 43337
- Mission duration: 61.4 minutes
- Distance travelled: 83 million km (52 million mi)

Spacecraft properties
- Manufacturer: Hughes Aircraft Company
- BOL mass: 340 kg (750 lb)
- Payload mass: 29 kg (64 lb)
- Power: 580 watts

Start of mission
- Launch date: October 18, 1989, 16:53:40 UTC
- Rocket: Space Shuttle Atlantis; STS-34/IUS
- Launch site: Kennedy LC-39B
- Deployed from: Galileo
- Deployment date: July 12, 1995, 03:07 UTC

End of mission
- Last contact: December 7, 1995, 23:06:08 UTC

Jupiter atmospheric probe
- Atmospheric entry: December 7, 1995, 22:04:44 UTC
- Impact site: 6.5°N 4.4°W

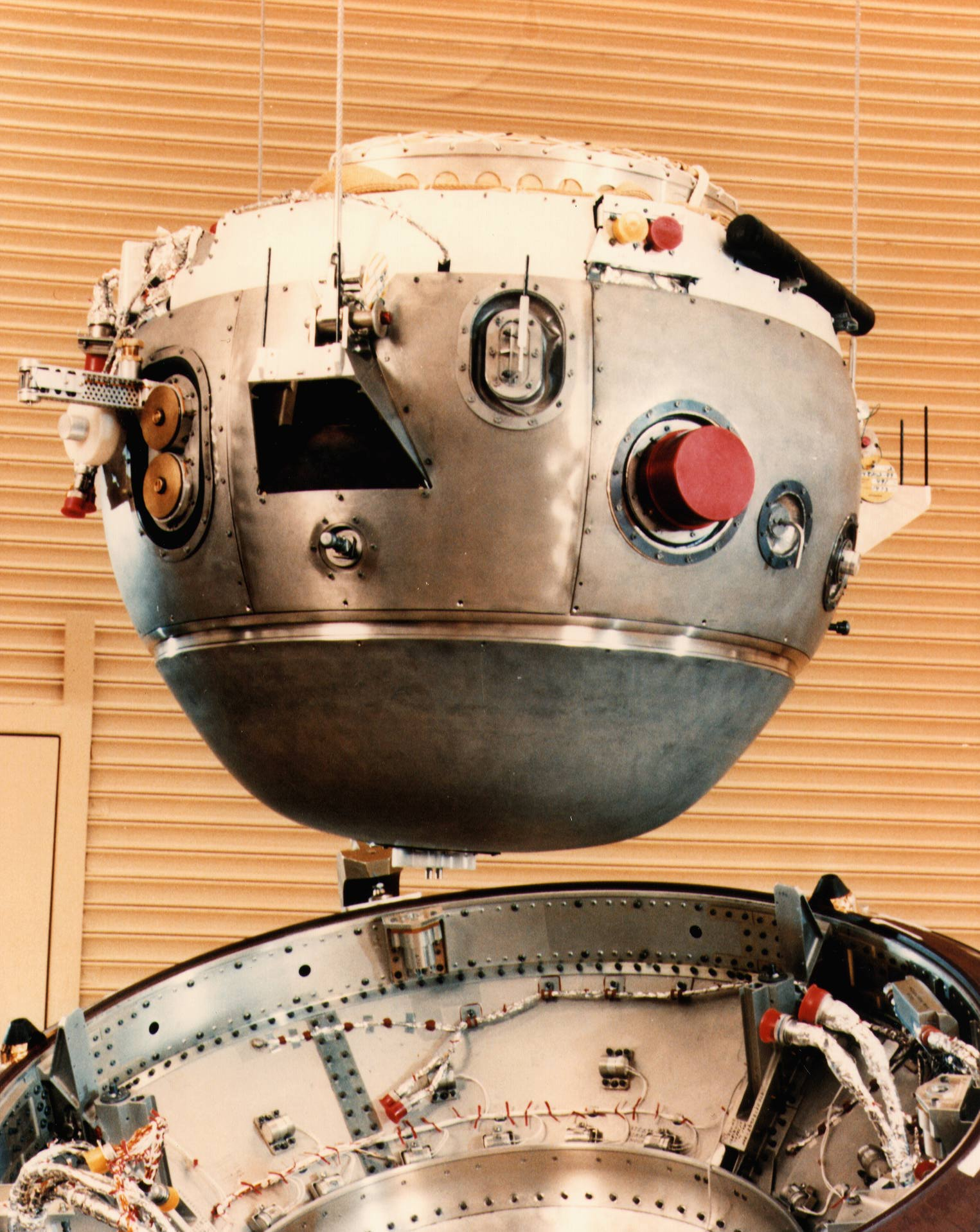
Inner Descent Module of the Galileo Entry Probe

The atmospheric probe was built by Hughes Aircraft Company's Space and Communications Group at its El Segundo, California plant. It weighed 339 kilograms (747 lb) and was 86 centimeters (34 in) tall.

=== Heat shield ===
The scientific instruments were protected from extreme heat and pressure by a heat shield during its high-speed journey into the Jovian atmosphere, entering at 48 kilometers per second (110,000 mph). Temperatures reached around 16,000 °C (29,000 °F). The ablative heat shield was made of carbon phenolic. Measuring initially at 14.6 cm (5.7 in) thick on the leading edge and 5.4 cm (2.1 in) on the trailing edge, after entry the leading edge was 5.1 cm (2.0 in) and the trailing edge was 1.04 cm (0.41 in). NASA built a special laboratory, the Giant Planet Facility, to simulate the heat load, which was similar to the convective and radiative heating experienced by an ICBM warhead reentering the atmosphere.

=== Batteries ===
The probe's electronics were powered by 13 lithium sulfur dioxide batteries manufactured by Honeywell's Power Sources Center in Horsham, Pennsylvania. Each cell was the size of a D battery so existing manufacturing tools could be used. They provided a nominal power output of about 7.2-ampere hours capacity at a minimal voltage of 28.05 volts.

=== Scientific instruments ===
The probe included seven instruments for taking data on its plunge into Jupiter:

Scientific instruments
Instrument	Function	Mass	Power consumption	Principal investigator	Organizations
Atmospheric structure instrument	Measuring temperature, pressure and deceleration	4.1 kg (9.0 lb)	6.3 W	Alvin Seiff	Ames Research Center and San Jose State University Foundation
Neutral mass spectrometer	Analyze the gas composition of the atmosphere	13 kg (29 lb)	29 W	Hasso Niemann	Goddard Space Flight Center
Helium Abundance Detector	An interferometer supporting atmospheric composition studies	1.4 kg (3.1 lb)	1.1 W	Ulf von Zahn	University of Bonn, University of Rostock
Nephelometer	Cloud location and cloud-particle observations	4.8 kg (11 lb)	14 W	Boris Ragent	Ames Research Center and San Jose State University Foundation
Net-flux radiometer	Measuring the difference between upward and downward radiant flux at each altitude	3.0 kg (6.6 lb)	7.0 W	L. Sromovsky	University of Wisconsin
Lightning and radio emission detector and energetic particles instrument	Measuring light and radio emissions associated with lightning, and fluxes of protons, electrons, alpha particles and heavy ions	2.7 kg (6.0 lb)	2.3 W	Louis Lanzerotti	Bell Laboratories, University of Florida and Federal Republic of Germany
Radio equipment	Measuring wind speeds and atmospheric absorption			David Atkinson	University of Idaho

In addition, the probe's heat shield contained instrumentation to measure ablation during descent.

== Termination ==
Lacking the fuel to escape Jupiter's gravity well, at the end of Galileo's life, the main spacecraft was deliberately crashed into Jupiter on September 21, 2003, to prevent forward contamination of possible life of Jupiter's moon Europa.

== Names ==
The Galileo Probe had COSPAR ID 1989-084E while the orbiter had id 1989-084B. Names for the spacecraft include Galileo Probe or Jupiter Entry Probe abbreviated JEP. The related COSPAR IDs of the Galileo mission were:

- 1989-084A STS 34
- 1989-084B Galileo
- 1989-084C IUS (Orbus 21)
- 1989-084D IUS (Orbus 6E)
- 1989-084E Galileo Probe

== See also ==
- Exploration of Jupiter
- List of missions to the outer planets
  - Europa Clipper
  - Juno (spacecraft)
  - Jupiter Icy Moons Explorer
- Atmosphere of Jupiter
- List of spacecraft powered by non-rechargeable batteries
