= Jump start (vehicle) =

Method of starting a motor vehicle

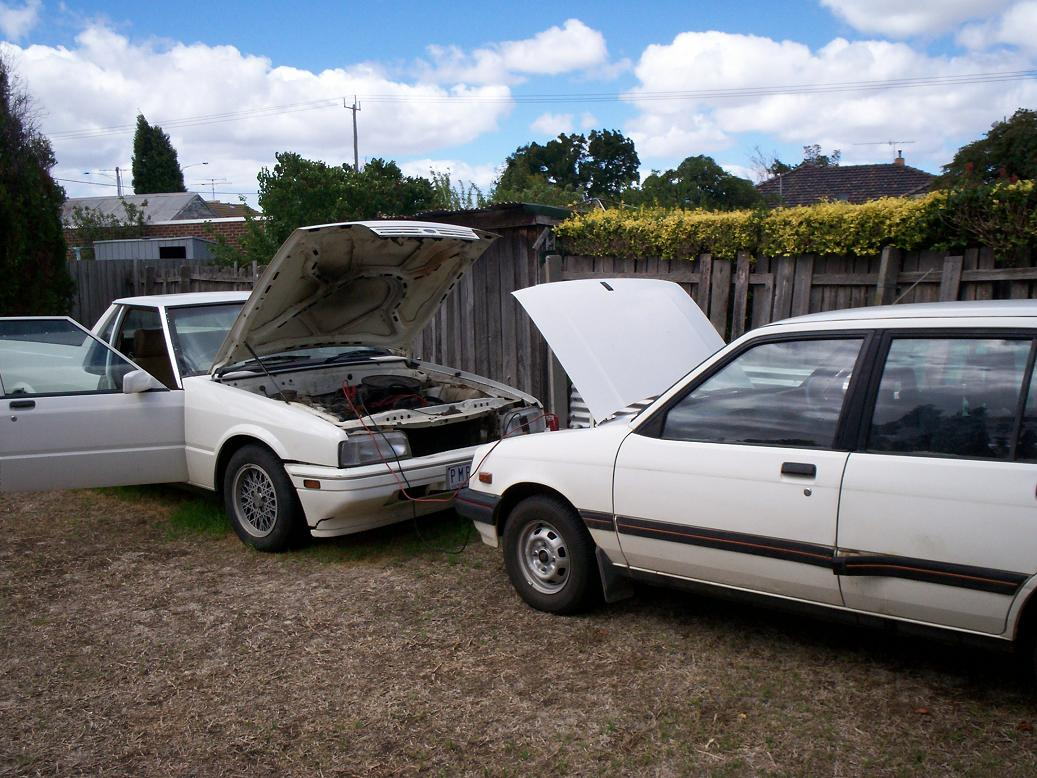
Jump starting a vehicle

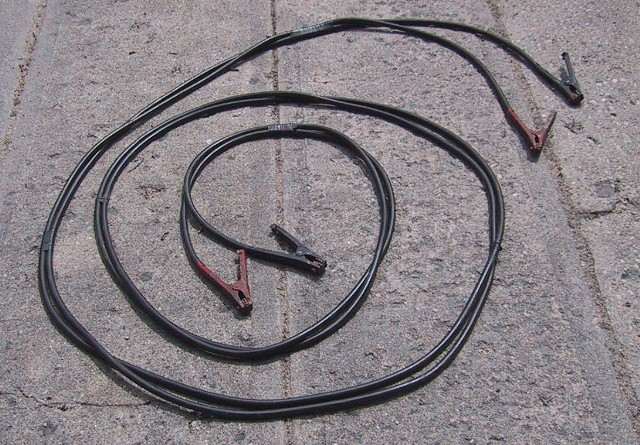
Crocodile clips, also called automotive clips, on a set of jumper cables

A jump start, also called a boost, is a procedure of starting a motor vehicle (most commonly cars or trucks) that has a discharged crank battery. A temporary connection is made to the battery of another vehicle, to external or to an internal high-current electrical power source. The external supply of electricity recharges the disabled vehicle's battery and provides some of the power needed to crank the engine. Once the vehicle has been started, its normal charging system will recharge, so the auxiliary source can be removed. If the vehicle charging system is functional, leaving the engine running will restore the charge of the battery.

Motorists may carry jumper cables and other equipment in case of accidental discharge of the vehicle battery (for example, by headlights, interior lights or ignition switch left on while the engine is not running). Safe procedures for connecting and disconnecting cables are given in the vehicle manual.

== Jumper cables ==
(1) to (4) is a safe sequence to connect jumper cables from the discharged battery on the left to the charged battery on the right. If (2) were connected before (1) and the loose end accidentally touches bare metal on the vehicle, the charged battery is shorted; shorting the discharged battery is less risky. (4) is connected to bare metal away from the battery to keep any sparking on circuit completion away from hydrogen potentially released by the battery. Cables are disconnected in reverse order.

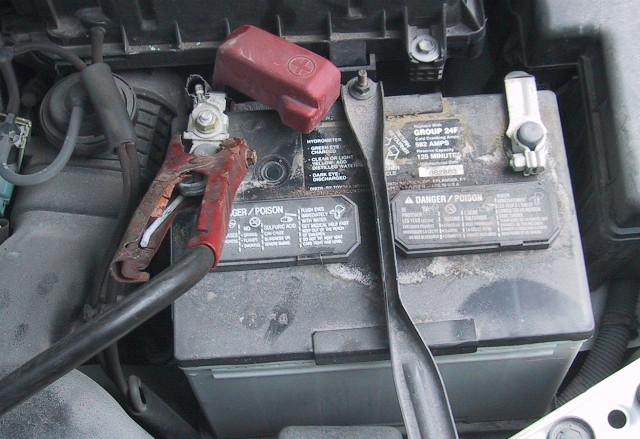
A jumper cable connected to the positive (red) terminal

Jumper cables, also known as booster cables or jump leads, are a pair of insulated wires of sufficient capacity with alligator clips at each end to interconnect the disabled vehicle with an auxiliary source, such as another vehicle with the same system voltage or to another battery. The alligator clips may be covered in insulation to prevent inadvertent shorting. Clips may be made of copper or steel. Alligator clips are generally marked by black (−) and red (+) to indicate the polarity.

== Procedures ==
Jump start procedures are usually found in the vehicle owner's manual. The recommended sequence of connections is intended to reduce the chance of accidentally shorting the good battery or igniting hydrogen gas. Owner's manuals will show the preferred locations for connection of jumper cables; for example, some vehicles have the battery mounted under a seat, or may have a jumper terminal in the engine compartment.

Jumper cables should not be used to interconnect between different voltage systems; for example, connecting 6-volt and 12-volt systems together may cause damage.

If the dead battery is physically damaged, has a low electrolyte level, is decayed or frozen, a jump start will not repair the battery. A vehicle with a frozen battery should not be jump started, as the battery may explode.

== Other methods ==
A hand-portable battery, equipped with attached cables and charger, can be used similarly to another vehicle's battery. A self-contained jump box contains a battery and connects directly to the battery of the engine that needs a boost. Portable boosters may automatically sense the battery's polarity prior to sending power to the vehicle, eliminating the damage that can result from reversing the connection. There are various portable jump starters that are multi-functional and can be used to charge other electronic devices as well.

=== Cigarette lighter outlet ===
An alternative to jumper cables is a cable used to interconnect the 12-volt power outlets (cigarette lighter outlets) of two vehicles. This method slowly recharges the battery, not by providing the current needed for cranking, as the starter motor current will greatly exceed the fuse rating in a cigarette lighter outlet. While this eliminates concerns with incorrect connections and generation of arcs near battery terminals, the amount of current available through such a connection is small. Unless current-limiting devices are incorporated into such cables, the probability of opening a fuse or circuit breaker in one of the vehicles during charging is high: and as there is no real standard for available current, potential performance is further limited by conservative design. Many vehicles turn off the cigarette lighter outlets when the key is turned off, making the technique unusable unless the ignition key is turned to the 'accessory' or 'on' position, after which the cigarette lighter outlet and battery become electrically connected. It may take many minutes for the battery to charge to the level where it can crank the engine, as current through the power outlet is limited. In contrast, heavy-gauge booster cables transmit much more current from the booster battery and may even be able to supply all the necessary cranking current.

=== Battery charger ===
Motorists and service garages often have a portable battery charger operated from AC power. Very small trickle chargers are intended only to maintain a charge on a parked or stored vehicle, but larger chargers can put enough charge into a battery to allow a start within a few minutes. Battery chargers may be strictly manual, or may include controls for time and charging voltage. Battery chargers that apply a high voltage (for example, more than 14.4 volts on a 12-volt nominal system) will result in the emission of hydrogen gas from the battery, which may damage it or create an explosion risk. A battery may be recharged without removal from the vehicle, although in a typical roadside situation no convenient source of power may be nearby.

=== Battery booster and jump starter ===
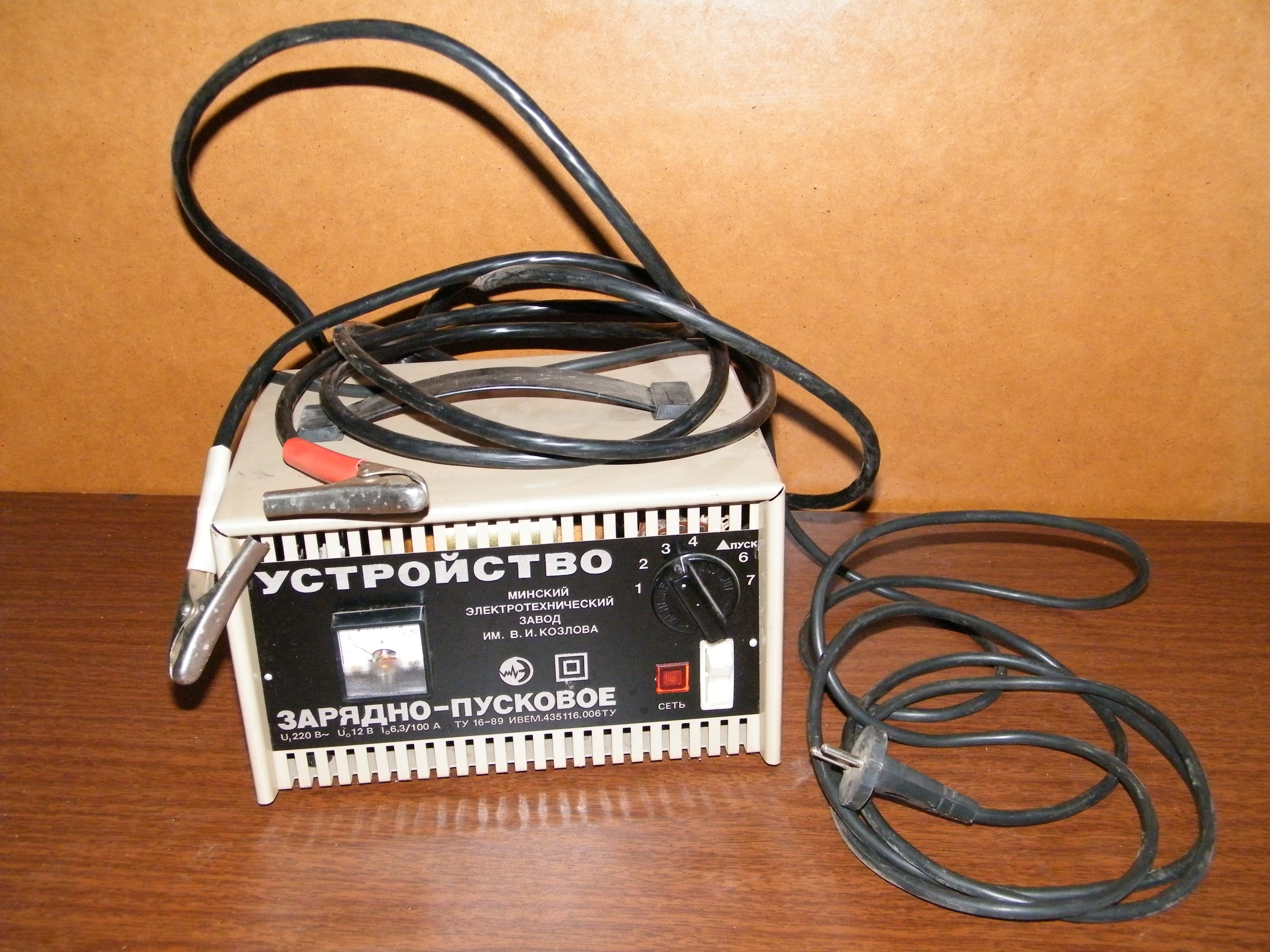
AC charger with boost feature

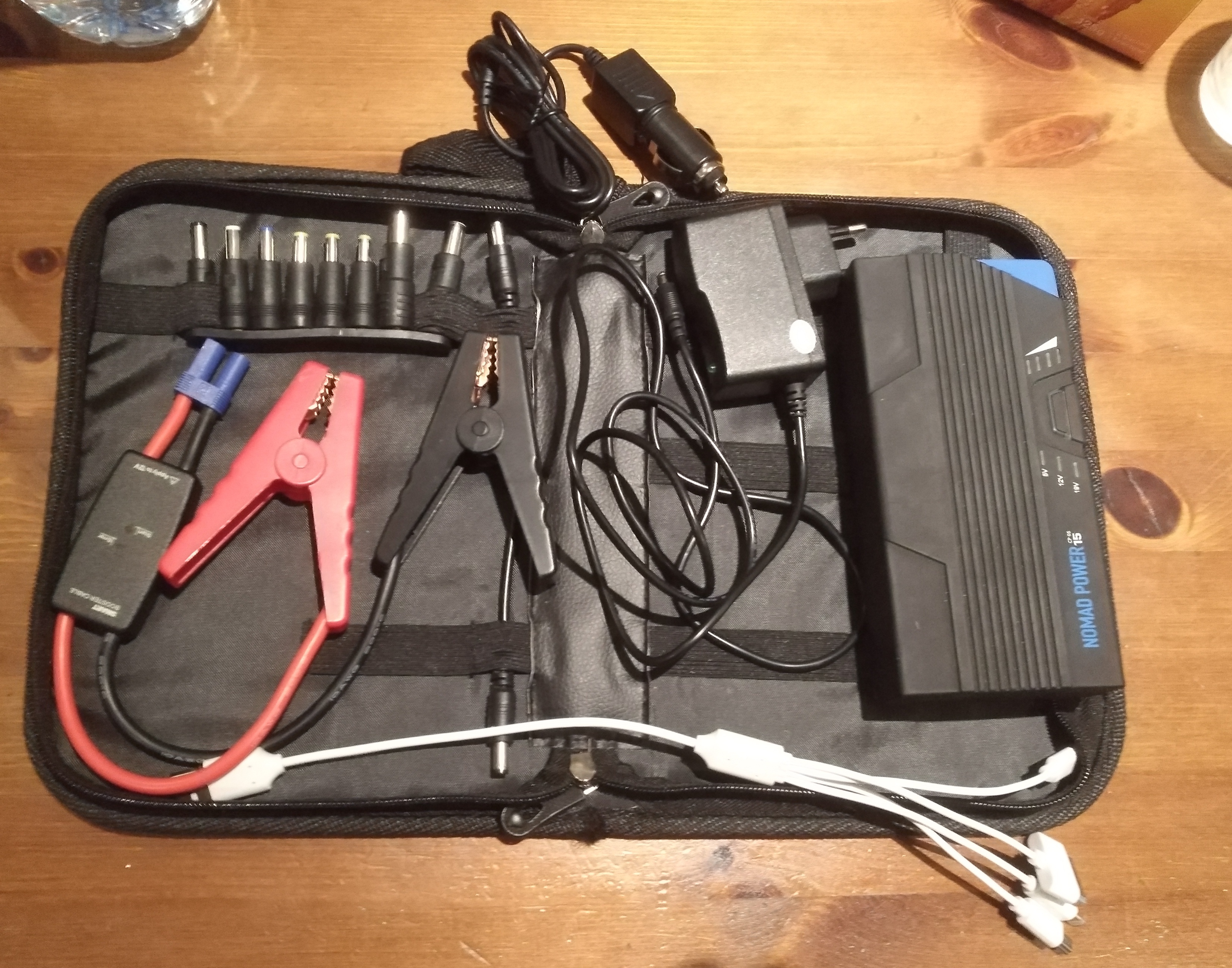
Jump starter with lithium battery

Some AC battery chargers have a boost, engine start, or engine assist feature. Despite being able to assist in jump starting a dead vehicle battery, these types of battery chargers perform their task over a longer period of time, rather than an instantaneous boost. Boosting a dead battery through a battery charger can take anywhere from five to twenty minutes depending on the depth of discharge (DOD), health of the vehicle battery, and type of engine (engine displacement). AC power is not usually available for a roadside boost.

Jump starters are portable battery devices that allow for jump starting of vehicles. These devices operate similar to jumper cables but do not require an additional vehicle to provide the power needed to boost the dead vehicle battery. Jump starters using lead-acid batteries claim ratings of 300–1700 amperes. The main disadvantage of lead-acid jump starters is weight, size and battery chemistry. Lead-acid jump starters can be extremely heavy and large, making them less than convenient when transporting between vehicles. Lead-acid batteries may self-discharge if they develop a condition called sulfating, which permanently decreases battery capacity. It is entirely possible to destroy a new lead-acid battery within months, requiring a replacement.

Jump starters using lithium-ion batteries began appearing in the market around 2013. Most lithium jump starter brands use a high-discharge lithium polymer or lithium-ion battery. Lithium jump starters are compact and lightweight compared to their lead-acid equivalents. These jump starters often incorporate a USB connection, allowing it to function as a portable charger for mobile electronic devices.

=== Push starting ===
A vehicle with a manual transmission may be push started. This requires caution while pushing the vehicle and may require the assistance of several persons or another vehicle. If the vehicle battery cannot provide power to the ignition system, push starting may be ineffective. Most vehicles with automatic transmissions cannot be started this way because the hydraulic torque converter in the transmission will not allow the engine to be driven by the wheels.

=== Military vehicles ===
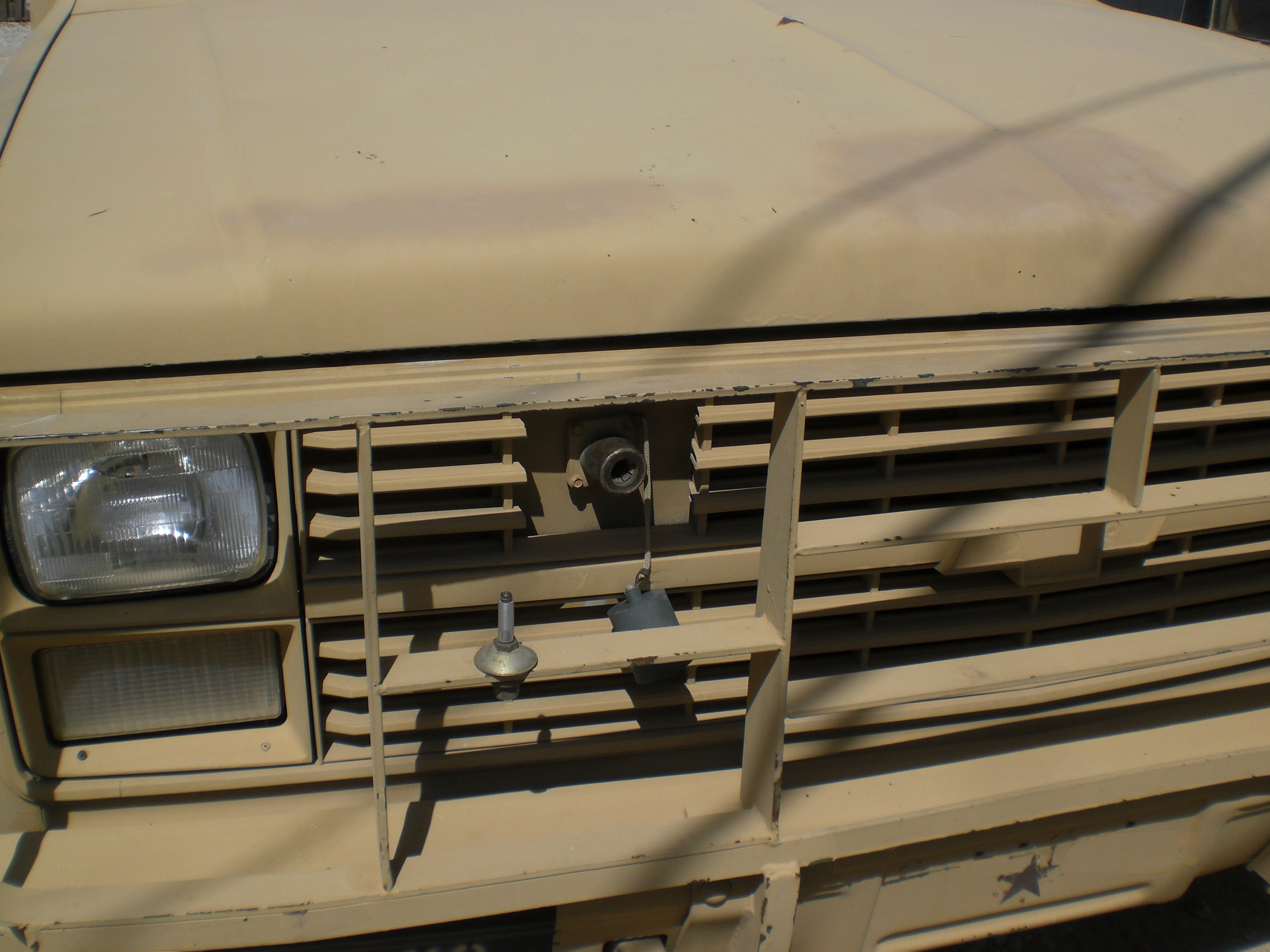
Slave receptacle on an M1009 Commercial Utility Cargo Vehicle

Generally referred to as "slave starting" in military parlance, the jump-starting procedure has been simplified for military vehicles. Tactical vehicles used by NATO militaries possess 24-volt electrical systems and, in accordance with STANAG 4074, have standard slave receptacles for easy connection. A slave cable is plugged into the receptacle on each vehicle, and the dead vehicle is started with the live vehicle's engine running.

== Hazards ==
Overcharging of a lead-acid battery may produce flammable hydrogen gas by electrolysis of water inside the battery. Motorists can be severely injured by a battery explosion. In the United States in 1994, a research note by the National Highway Traffic Safety Association estimated that about 442 persons were injured by exploding batteries while attempting a jump-start.

The effects of accidentally reversing the cables will depend on the charge state of the depleted vehicle and the current-carrying capacity of the cables. A partially depleted battery will result in more current through the reversed cables than if the battery were simply dead. Jumper cables typically do not have overload protection, so when reversed they may melt their insulation or short-circuit the supplying battery. Attempting to reverse-charge a dead battery can damage it. Reversed voltage applied to the vehicle electronics may also damage them.

Explosion can be prevented by removing the discharged, dead or damaged battery and directly connecting to the battery cable terminals when jump starting, as the explosion is caused by battery or battery-related issue.

== Voltage problem ==
Heavy vehicles such as large trucks, excavation equipment, or vehicles with diesel engines may use 24-volt electrical systems. Trucks usually have a 24-volt supply using two 12-volt automotive batteries in series: it is therefore possible to jump-start a vehicle with a 12-volt electrical system using only one of the two batteries.

Vintage cars may have 6-volt electrical systems, or may connect the positive terminal of the battery to the chassis. The methods intended for boosting 12-volt, negative-ground vehicles cannot be used in such cases.

Hybrid vehicles may have a very small 12-volt battery system unsuitable for sourcing the large amount of current required to boost a conventional vehicle. However, as the 12-volt system of a hybrid vehicle is only required to start up the control system of the vehicle, a very small portable battery may successfully boost a hybrid that has accidentally discharged its 12-volt system; the main propulsion battery is unlikely to also have been discharged.
