= ColdHeat =

American company

A ColdHeat soldering iron

ColdHeat was an American company founded to develop and market products using the proprietary graphite-like compound Athalite. The composite material is claimed by the manufacturer to have the unusual ability to conduct large amounts of heat and return to room temperature in a short amount of time.

== Soldering iron ==
The split tip of a ColdHeat soldering iron

The first two products were soldering irons powered by alkaline batteries. The manufacturer claims this soldering iron is unique in that its Athalite tip undergoes a temperature change from ambient temperature to approximately 800 °F (427 °C) and back to ambient within three seconds when the tip is removed from the work.

The tip of this apparatus is split into two sections that completes an electrical circuit when a low electrical resistance is placed across the tip; e.g. metallic contacts, or solder. With a current flowing, the resistance of both the solder and the tip produces enough heat to increase the temperature beyond the melting point of solder. For the light-duty work it was designed for, the Athalite tip heats just enough and can cool very rapidly; however, if applied to something with large thermal capacity such as a metal chassis, the tip can become extremely hot and can take over a minute to cool in an extreme case.

It is thought that the irons cannot be used indiscriminately for all work; the voltage across and current through the tip can damage electronic circuits being soldered. When not in contact with a joint, the split tip has 6 or more volts across it, enough to destroy semiconductor p-n junctions on contact if the iron accidentally touches multiple closely spaced pads. This is not static-electricity damage; any voltage over about 0.7V capable of delivering high current can destroy a semiconductor junction.

=== Criticism ===
The tip is reported to be very easily damaged mechanically. The unit does not have enough power for effective desoldering of many board- and chassis-mounted components. The design of the tip is incompatible with some soldering techniques such as dragging or continuous-flow soldering (a popular technique for hand-soldering high-pin-count SMT packages, based on the principles of wave soldering).

One thorough review of the ColdHeat soldering iron noted:

"For the electronics hobbyist, one particularly disconcerting side-effect of the Coldheat way of doing things is that localised arcing and sparking may be produced sporadically when the heating circuit opens or closes. ... sparks anywhere near a semiconductor are an anathema to the electronics enthusiast. High reverse voltages can be produced in inductive circuits as well. ..."

"The overall results of the soldering exercise were very disappointing. ... the test results on the PCB were of extremely mixed quality. ... The quality of the soldered joints was extremely inconsistent, due to the lack of temperature control and other variables that affect the finished joint. ... perhaps 20% of the finished joints being of a reasonably good standard... It was difficult to feed solder onto the joint at a consistent rate because the heating effect was variable. ...The dull crystalline appearance of many joints points to inadequate heating, caused by the heat not sinking throughout the joint sufficiently to melt the solder thoroughly, before the iron was removed. Although a grey crystalline joint will often form a sufficiently working joint for non-critical applications, the circuit might have an intermittent fault because of this. ..."

"There is ... no escaping the most fundamental principle of soldering: in order to make a good quality solder joint, all parts should be heated to the melting point of the solder so that it can flow properly. In the case of "cold-soldering" a PCB ... only one half of the joint can effectively be heated by the iron, e.g. a cropped resistor lead that you use to short out the electrodes to generate heat. Solder can then melt onto the hot leadout but it is then forced to flow onto the other component (the PCB copper pad) which is completely cold. Inadequate through-heating of components is the main cause of dry (gray) solder joints. What little heat there is, sinks away through the workpiece and the solder never flows properly. A crystalline, dull and brittle joint is formed. ...with our test circuit board... three PCB copper pads were damaged by excess heat, causing the copper track to lift away from the laminate altogether. ... Unfortunately we failed to finish and test our sample board successfully, due to the damage caused to three copper pads."

"... With just a little practice with an ordinary electric iron ...it is perfectly possible for any novice or hobbyist to produce good quality consistent results ...that are superior – and faster – than the Coldheat principle. ..."

"Unfortunately, I can’t recommend the Coldheat soldering iron to the average electronics constructor unless they are extremely accident-prone, lacking confidence or have a real need to go cordless: they should save money and buy an ordinary electric iron instead. ...Users stand a much better chance of producing a higher quality and more consistent solder joint with an ordinary iron using accepted techniques... ."

== Athalite ==
Athalite is a highly malleable, yet fragile, composite material. The name is derived from "Accelerated THermal Action". It is most likely composed of graphite. It might also be formed by other materials containing semiconductive elements such as germanium or silicon, as stated in the patent application. A nickel-chromium or other resistive alloy is another possibility listed in the application, but is unlikely to have been used.

== Other products ==
Prior to the website's closure, ColdHeat featured products other than the soldering tool that use the same technology, including a cordless hot-melt glue gun called Freestyle. It heats up much more quickly than others (but not instantly like the solder tool.) It comes with a built-in stand, a pack of mini glue sticks, rechargeable battery, battery charger with its AC adapter, and an instructional manual and a book with different project ideas. However, much like the soldering tool, the Freestyle also had quality issues, usually related to the battery charge, and the heating element. There is a model that runs on AA batteries, for those who prefer their convenience.

ColdHeat had recently released a cordless heated seat, as well as a selection of heated pet beds.

== Current status ==
ColdHeat signed a licensing deal with Weller/Cooper Tools in November 2005. Weller sold the ColdHeat Pro as the Weller CHT100.

== See also ==
- Helping hand (tool)
