= Soldering iron =

Hand tool for soldering

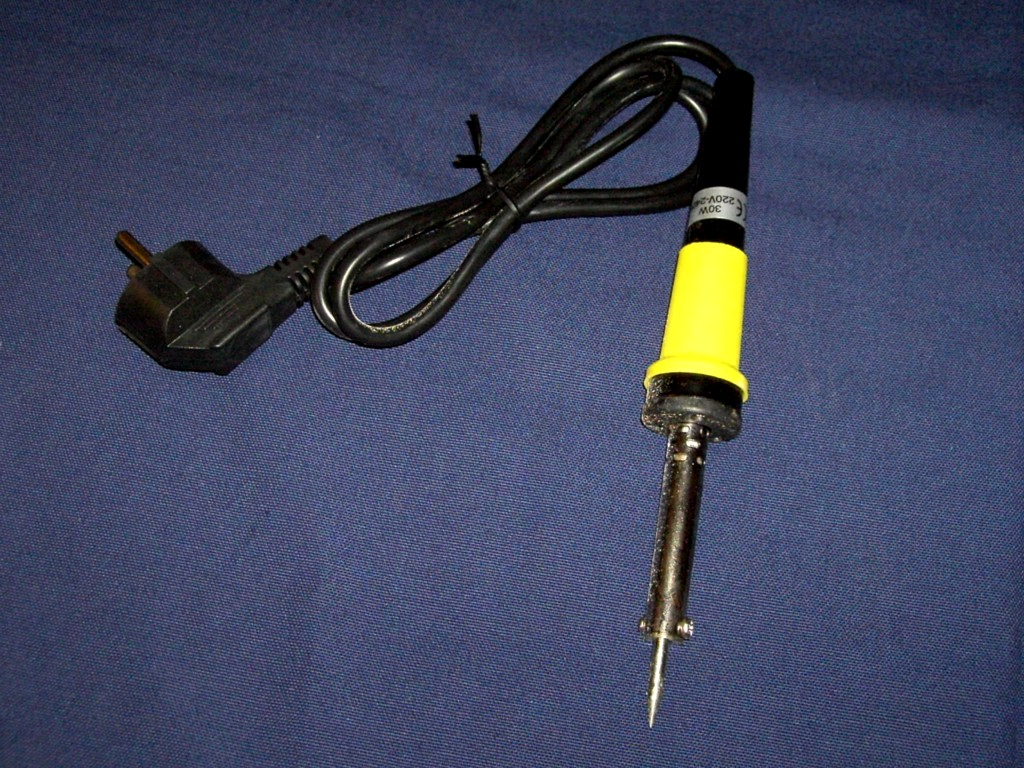
Electric soldering iron

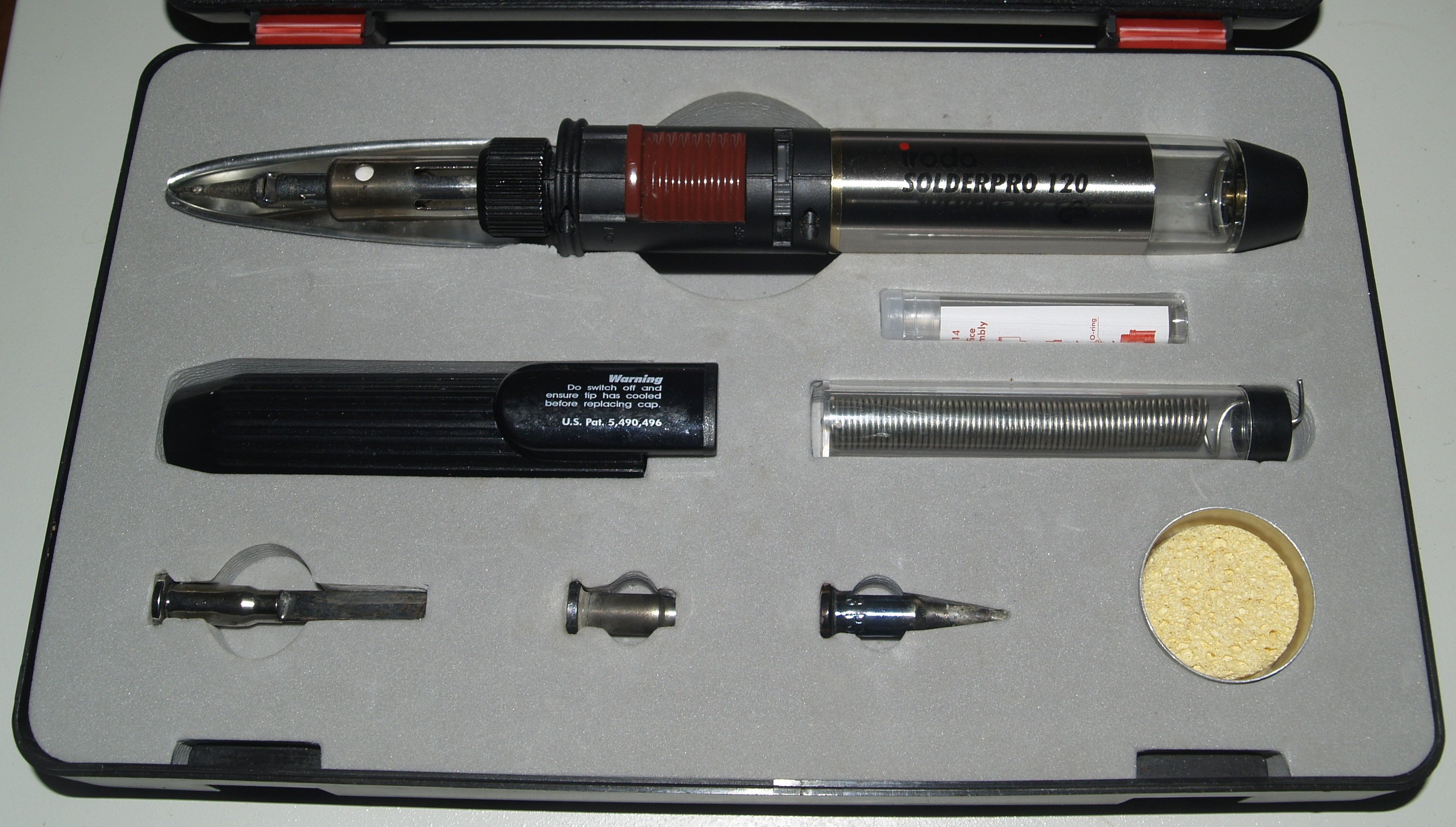
A gas-fired soldering iron

A soldering iron is a hand tool used in soldering. It supplies heat to melt solder so that it can flow into the joint between two workpieces.

A soldering iron is composed of a heated metal tip (the bit) and an insulated handle. Heating is often achieved electrically, by passing an electric current (supplied through an electrical cord or battery cables) through a resistive heating element. Cordless irons can be heated by combustion of gas stored in a small tank, often using a catalytic heater rather than a flame. Simple irons, less commonly used today than in the past, were simply a large copper bit on a handle, heated in a flame.

Solder melts at approximately 185 °C (365 °F). Soldering irons are designed to reach a temperature range of 200 to 480 °C (392 to 896 °F).

Soldering irons are most often used for installation, repairs, and limited production work in electronics assembly. High-volume production lines use other soldering methods. Large irons may be used for soldering joints in sheet metal objects. Less common uses include pyrography (burning designs into wood) and plastic welding (as an alternative to ultrasonic welding).

== History ==
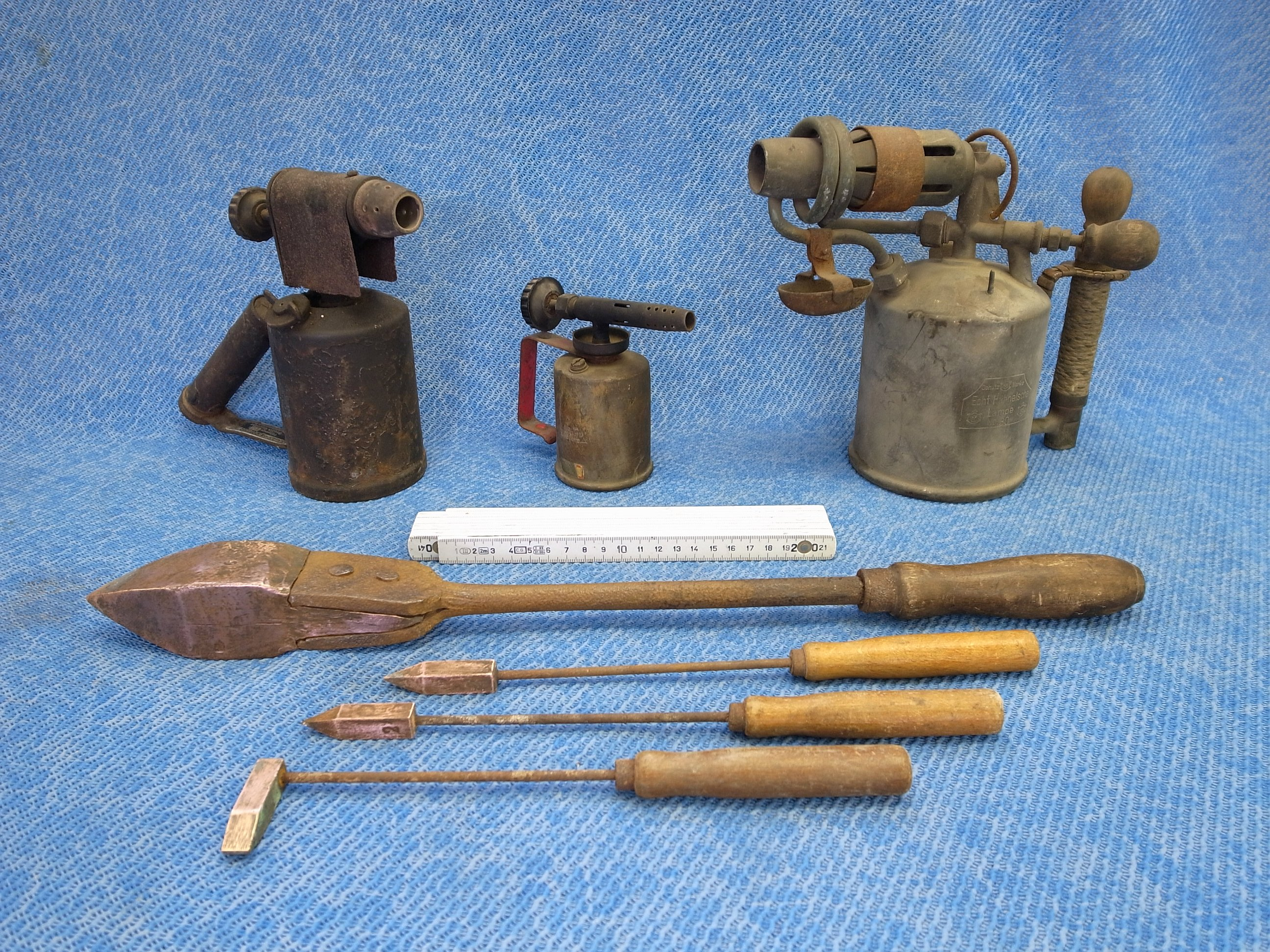
Historical soldering irons (front) and torches (back)

Before the development of electric soldering irons, the typical soldering iron consisted of a copper block, with an appropriately shaped point, supported on an iron rod and held in a wood handle. Immediately before use, the iron was heated over a fire or in a charcoal brazier, and it had to be reheated whenever it became too cool for use. Soldering irons were primarily used by tinsmiths and coppersmiths to work with thin sheet metal.

A large copper block was required in order to have sufficient thermal capacity to provide useful heat after removal from the fire, and copper is expensive. This led to the development of soldering irons that had a small copper tip attached to an inexpensive cast-iron block. Some irons even had removable and replaceable copper tips.

The first electric soldering iron had a very lightweight platinum tip heated by electric current flowing through the tip itself. By 1889, electric soldering irons were being developed with a resistance wire wrapped around the back end of the copper head and enclosed in a protective shell. Alternatively, the heating element could be enclosed in a relatively light-weight hollow copper head.

In 1894, the American Electrical Heater Company began manufacturing electrical soldering irons on a large scale in Detroit. They started producing them and shortly after American Electrical Heater Company released their line of soldering irons. In 1905, Scientific American Magazine, published a tutorial on making a soldering iron that clearly explains how early irons were made.

In 1921, a German company founded by Ernst Sachs developed an electrical soldering iron similar to American Electrical Heater Company iron. in 1926, William Alferink applied for a patent for the first soldering station.

== Actual "Form factor" of soldering irons ==
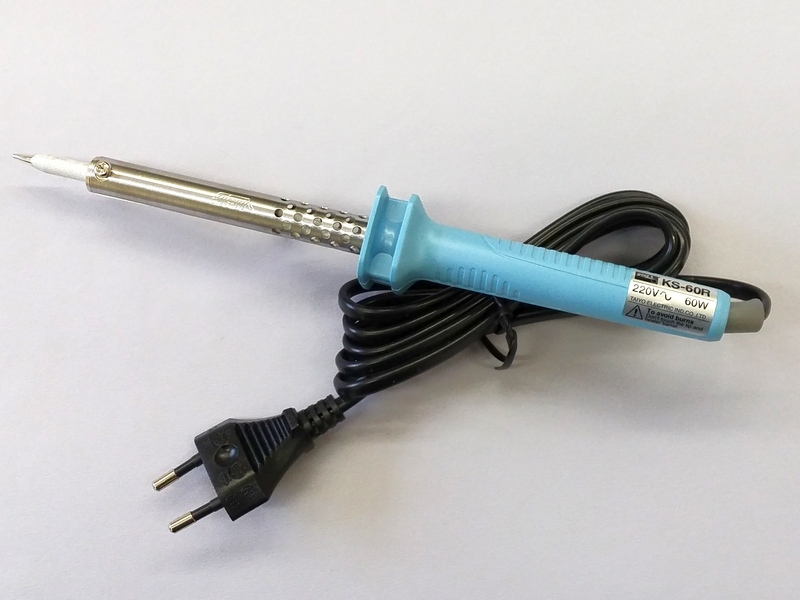
Electric soldering iron for electronic work

In 1946, Carl E. Weller applied for a patent for his soldering gun that could heat instantaneously and began production of the "Speedy Iron" in Pennsylvania. It was manufactured through the Weller Manufacturing Company, and this product was the first instantaneous thermal soldering gun. Few years later, they released to the market a soldering iron on with self-adjusting temperature. In 1951, the company WEN Products began manufacturing its own instantaneous soldering iron. After a three years trial Weller won for patent infringement.

In 1960 Weller got the patent for the soldering iron "Magnastat", renewed in 1964 and 1971. This iron could control the temperature by using a temperature-sensitive magnetic tip. The "Magnastat" became a best seller and it was included it in the W-TCP soldering station in 1967. In fact, within the patent, as a complementary description, it defines what today has become the "de facto", the redundancy is worth it, "form factor" of the vast majority of current Japanese and Chinese irons: Hakko, Baku, etc... The now-expired patent, which even Weller has stopped using on some models, described an outer tube holding the coated copper tip, clamped with a nut to the handle.

Located at the remote rear end of draw tube 26, and held thereto by peripheral flange 27, is a freely rotatable threaded nut 28 adapted to be threaded about nut receiving stud 29 of cover flange 21 to draw the tip 11 into proper engagement

== Types ==
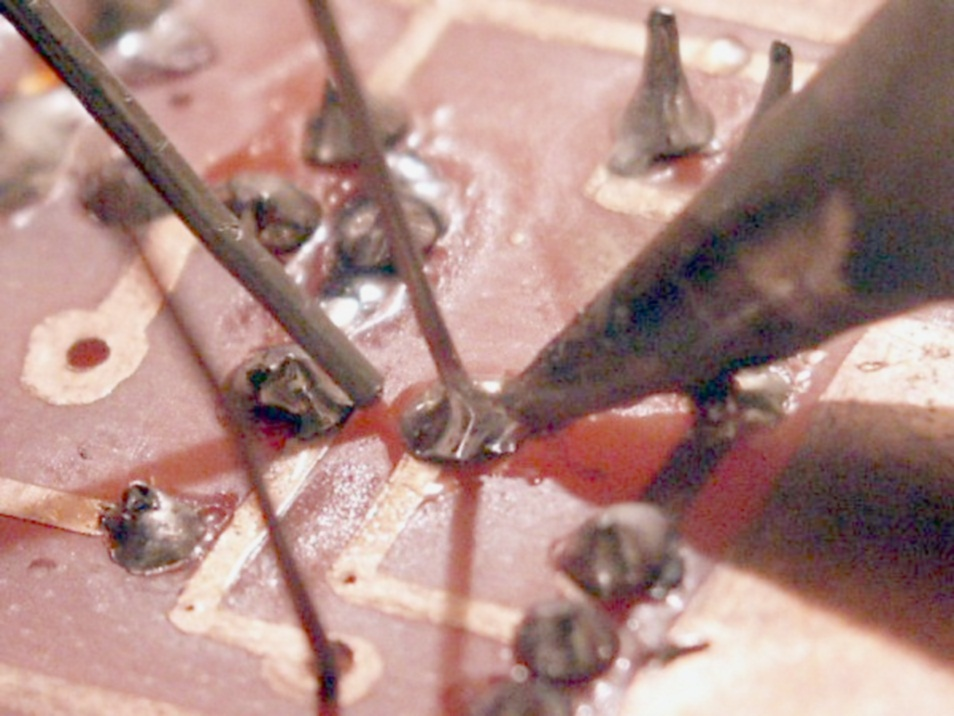
Soldering iron in use

=== Simple iron ===
For electrical and electronics work, a low-power iron, a power rating between 15 and 35 watts, is used. Higher ratings are available, but do not run at higher temperature; instead there is more heat available for making soldered connections to things with large thermal capacity, for example, a metal chassis. Some irons are temperature-controlled, running at a fixed temperature in the same way as a soldering station, with higher power available for joints with large heat capacity. Simple irons run at an uncontrolled temperature determined by thermal equilibrium; when heating something large their temperature drops.

A variation is the Scope soldering iron, common in Australia, which operates from a low-voltage source such as transformer or battery, and heats in seconds when the user pushes the thumb-guard, which then acts as a heat controller.

=== Cordless iron ===
Small irons heated by a battery, or by combustion of a gas such as butane in a small self-contained tank, can be used when electricity is unavailable or cordless operation is required. The operating temperature of these irons is not regulated directly; gas irons may change power by adjusting gas flow. Gas-powered irons may have interchangeable tips including different size soldering tips, hot knife for cutting plastics, miniature blow-torch with a hot flame, and small hot air blower for such applications as shrinking heat shrink tubing.

=== Temperature-controlled soldering iron ===
Section of a soldering iron tip with an internal heating element

Simple soldering irons reach a temperature determined by thermal equilibrium, dependent upon power input and cooling by the environment and the materials it comes into contact with. The iron temperature will drop when in contact with a large mass of metal such as a chassis; a small iron will lose too much temperature to solder a large connection. More advanced irons for use in electronics have a mechanism with a temperature sensor and method of temperature control to keep the tip temperature steady; more power is available if a connection is large. Temperature-controlled irons may be free-standing, or may comprise a head with heating element and tip, controlled by a base called a soldering station, with control circuitry and temperature adjustment and sometimes display.

A variety of means are used to control temperature. The simplest of these is a variable power control, much like a light dimmer, which changes the equilibrium temperature of the iron without automatically measuring or regulating the temperature. Another type of system uses a thermostat, often inside the iron's tip, which automatically switches power on and off to the element. A thermal sensor such as a thermocouple may be used in conjunction with circuitry to monitor the temperature of the tip and adjust power delivered to the heating element to maintain a desired temperature. In some models, the firmware for the control circuitry is free software that can be modified by the end-user.

Another approach is to use magnetized soldering tips which lose their magnetic properties at a specific temperature, the Curie point. As long as the tip is magnetic, it closes a switch to supply power to the heating element. When it exceeds the design temperature it opens the contacts, cooling until the temperature drops enough to restore magnetisation. More complex Curie-point irons circulate a high-frequency AC current through the tip, using magnetic physics to direct heating only where the surface of the tip drops below the Curie point.

=== Soldering station ===
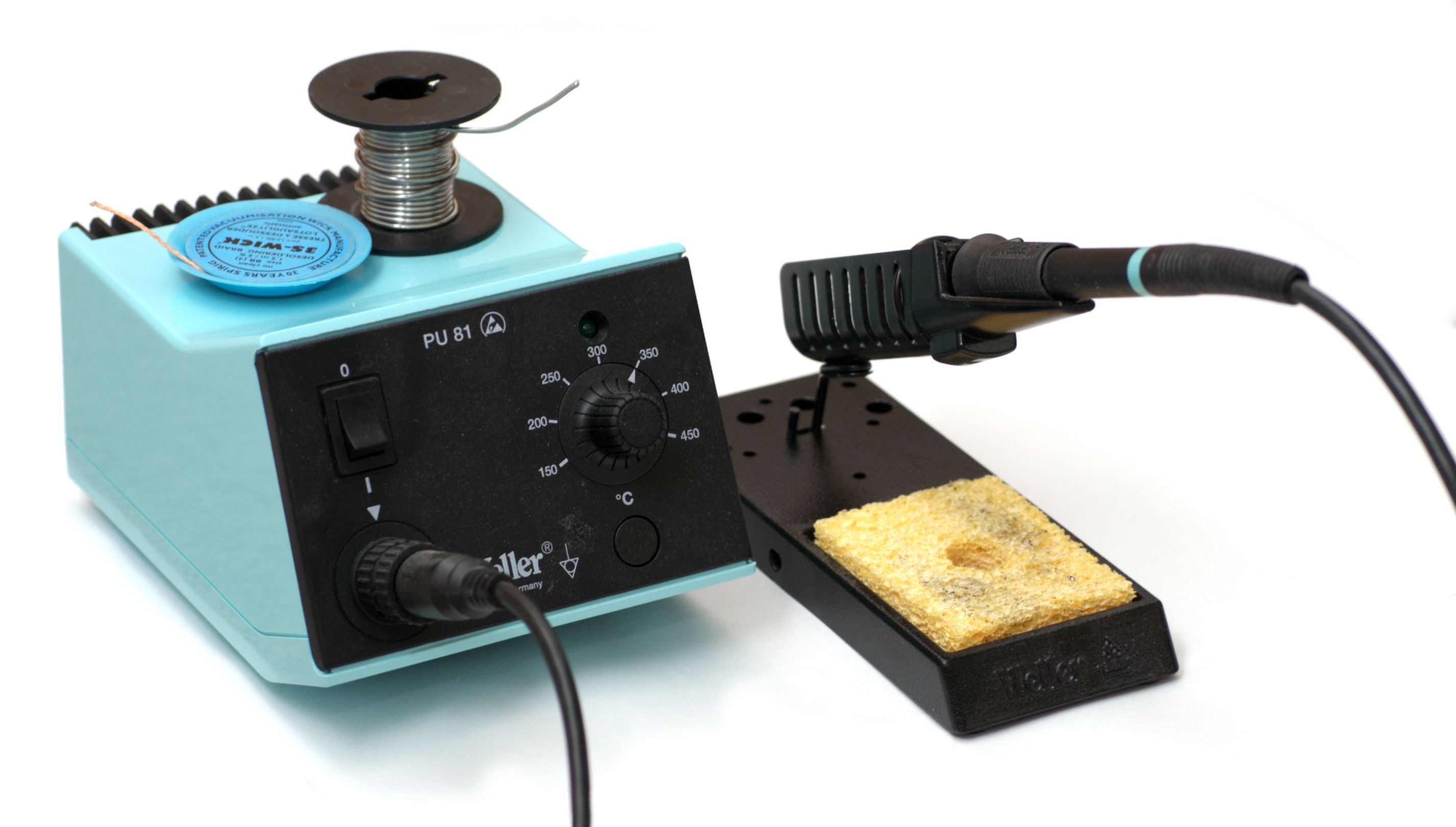
Temperature-controlled soldering station

A soldering station has a temperature control and consists of an electrical power supply, control circuitry with provision for user adjustment of temperature and display, and a soldering iron or soldering head with a tip temperature sensor. The station will normally have a stand for the hot iron when not in use, and a wet sponge for cleaning. It is most commonly used for soldering electronic components. Other functions may be combined; for example a rework station, mainly for surface-mount components may have a hot air gun, vacuum pickup tool, and a soldering head; a desoldering station will have a desoldering head with vacuum pump for desoldering through-hole components, and a soldering iron head.

=== Soldering tweezers ===
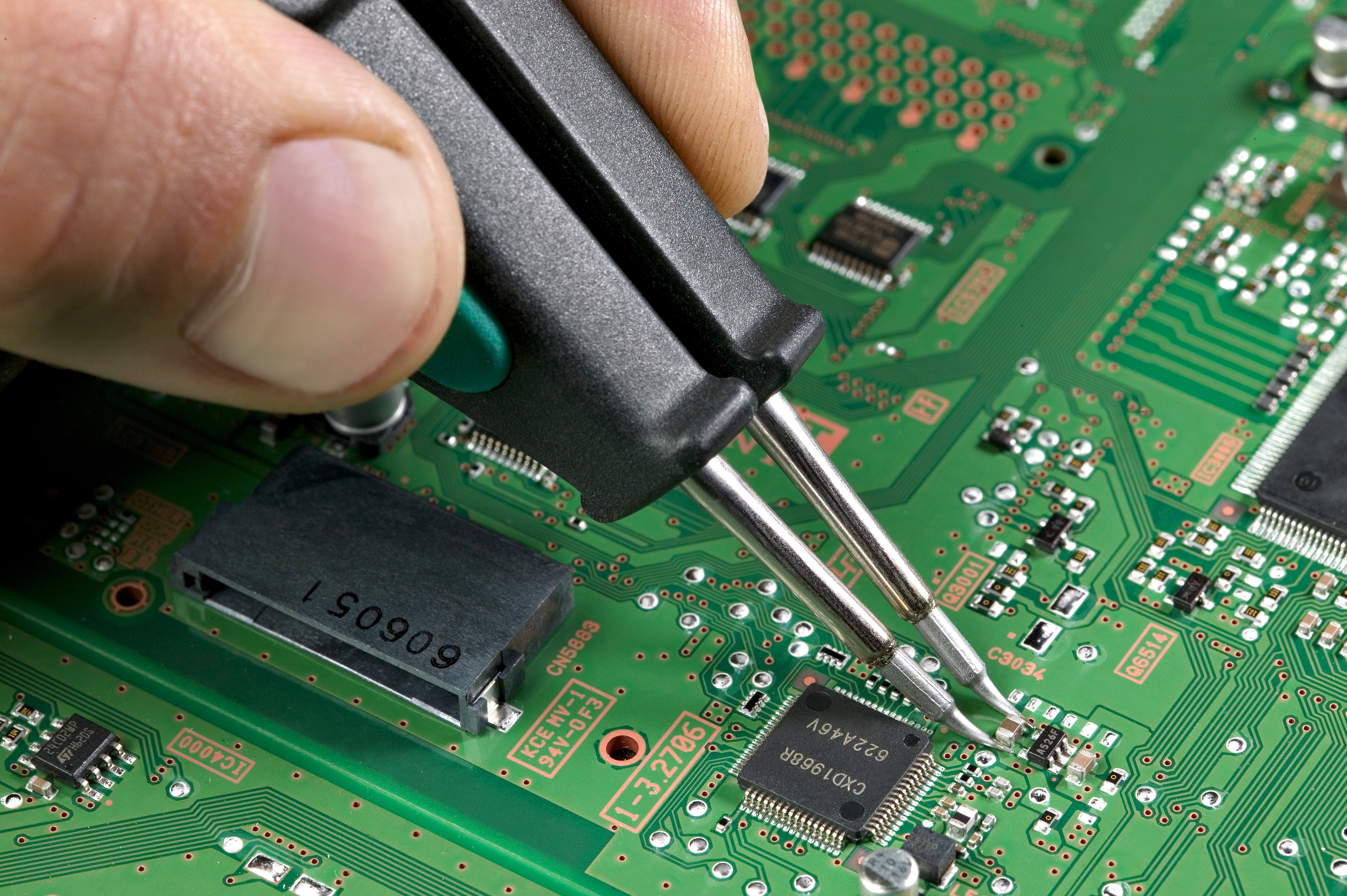
Soldering tweezers in use

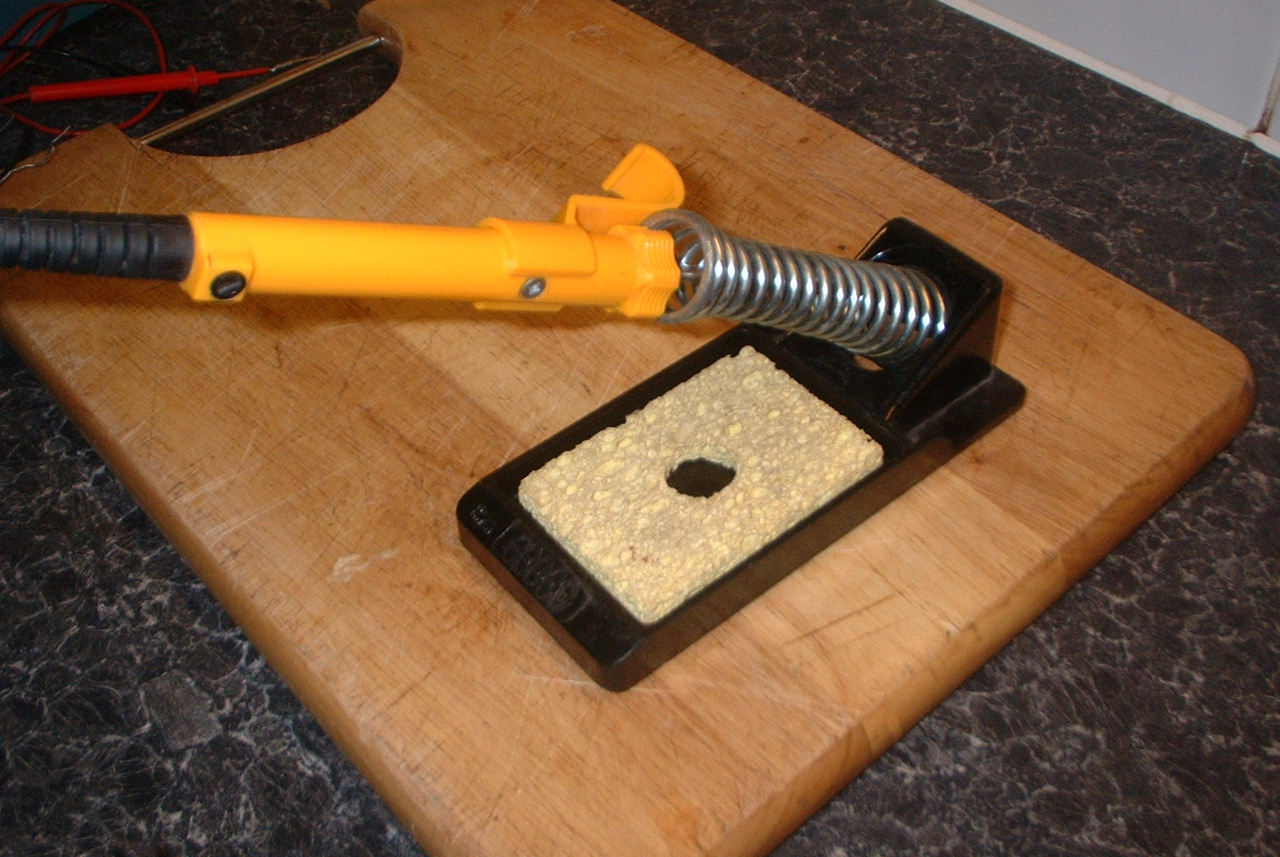
Soldering iron stand

For soldering and desoldering small surface-mount components with two terminals, such as some links, resistors, capacitors, and diodes, soldering tweezers can be used; they can be either free-standing or controlled from a soldering station. The tweezers have two heated tips mounted on arms whose separation can be manually varied by squeezing gently against spring force, like simple tweezers; the tips are applied to the two ends of the component. The main purpose of the soldering tweezers is to melt solder in the correct place; components are usually moved by simple tweezers or vacuum pickup.

=== Hot knife ===
A hot knife is a form of soldering iron equipped with a double-edged blade that is situated on a heating element. These tools can reach temperatures of up to 1,000 degrees Fahrenheit (538 degrees Celsius) allowing for cuts of fabric and foam materials without worry of fraying or beading. Hot knives can be utilized in automotive, marine, and carpeting applications, as well as other industrial and personal uses.

== Stands ==
A soldering iron stand keeps the iron away from flammable materials, and often also comes with a cellulose sponge and flux pot for cleaning the tip. Some soldering irons for continuous and professional use come as part of a soldering station, which allows the exact temperature of the tip to be adjusted, kept constant, and sometimes displayed.

== Tips ==
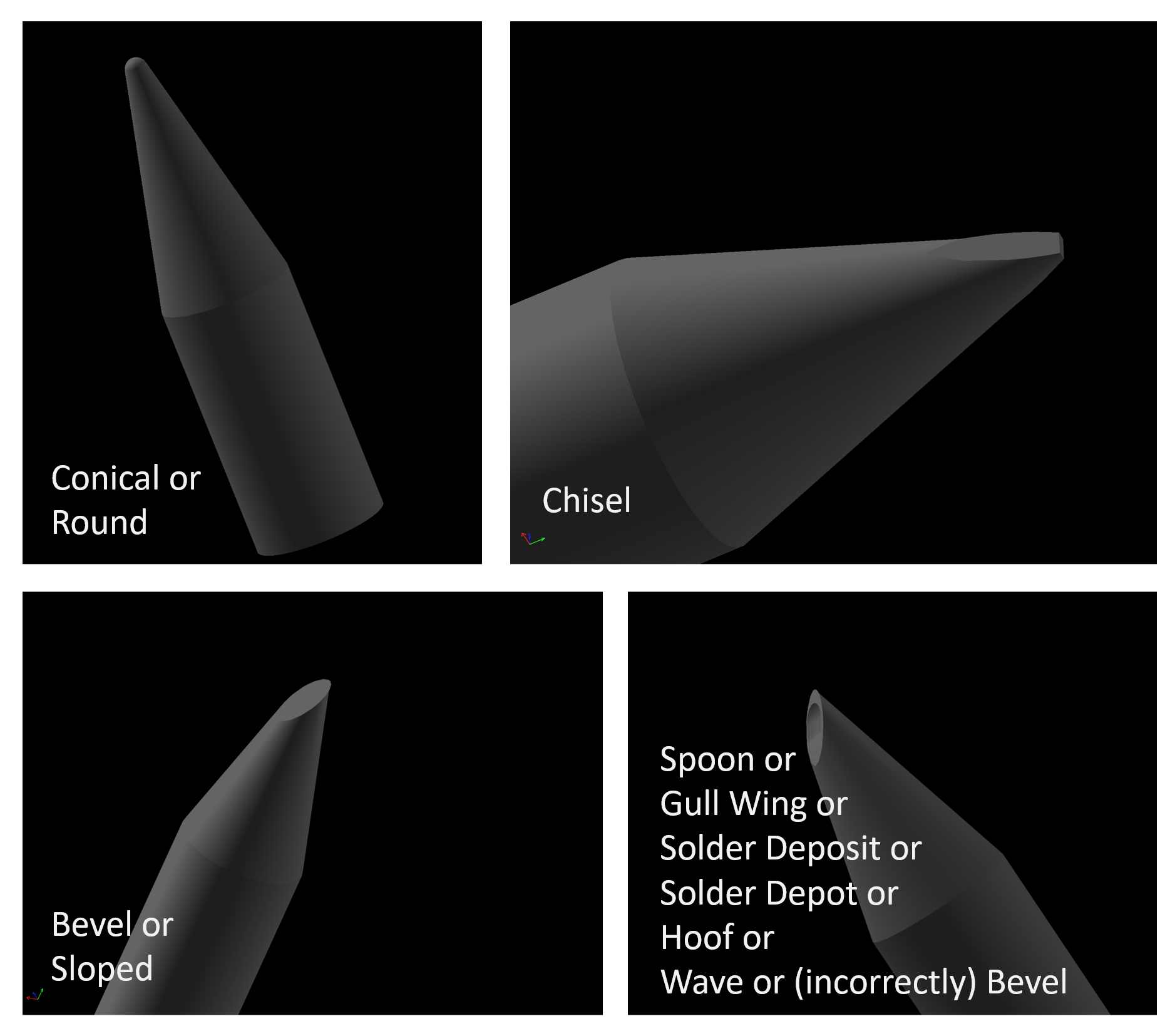
Some common soldering iron tips (also known as soldering bits). Note that there are different tip style naming conventions from manufacturer to manufacturer. Some very typical names are listed here.

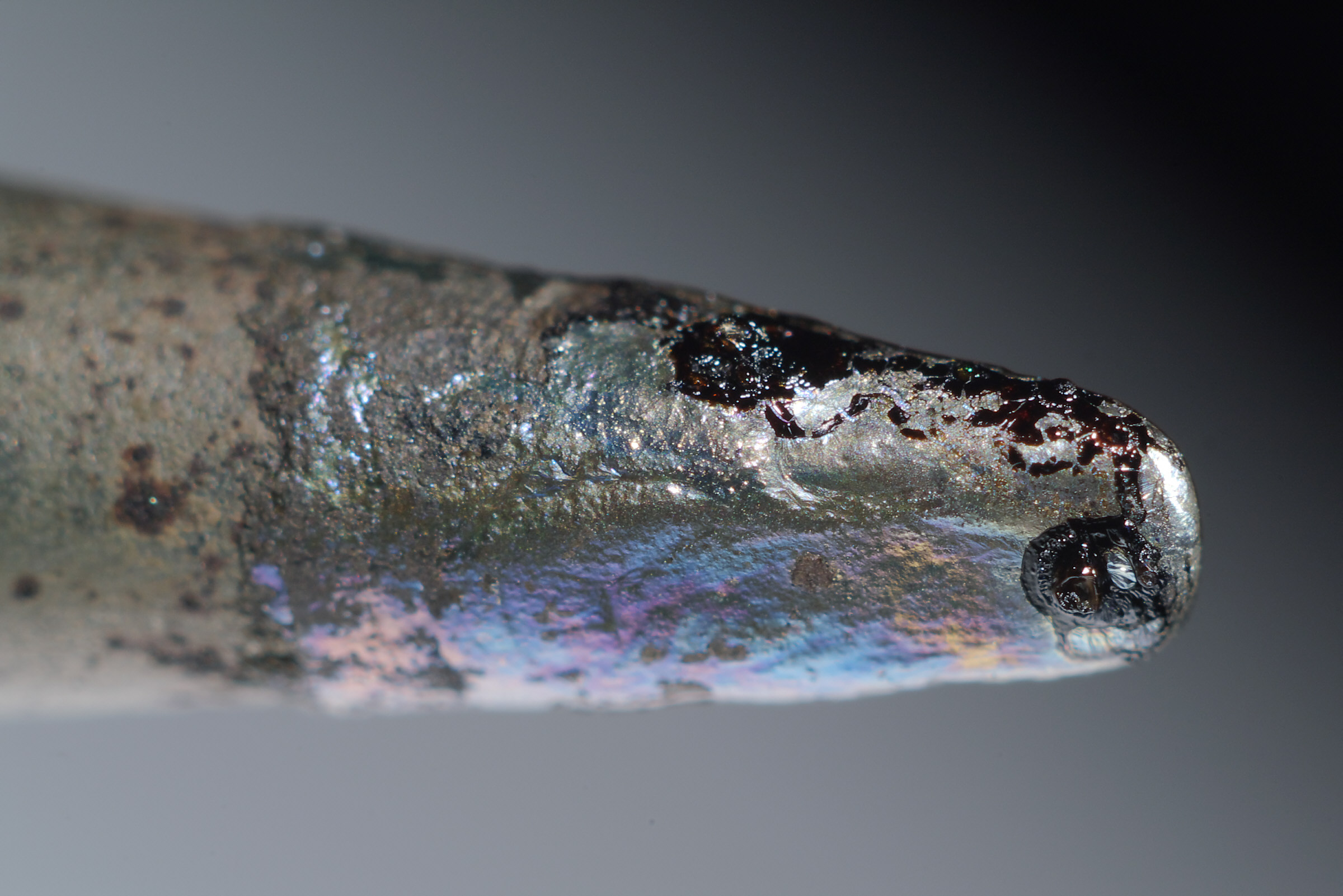
Used plated tip with remains of solder flux

Most soldering irons for electronics have interchangeable tips, also known as bits, that vary in size and shape for different types of work. Common tip shapes include: bevel, chisel, and conical. An example of a more specialist tip is spoon or gull wing, which features concavity. See the above image for renderings of a few different tip shapes and some of the names given to them.

Pyramid tips with a triangular flat face and chisel tips with a wide flat face are useful for soldering sheet metal. Fine conical or tapered chisel tips are typically used for electronics work. Tips may be straight or have a bend. Concave or wicking tips with a chisel face with a concave well in the flat face to hold a small amount of solder are available. Tip selection depends upon the type of work and access to the joint; soldering of 0.5mm pitch surface-mount ICs, for example, is quite different from soldering a through-hole connection to a large area. A concave tip well is said to help prevent bridging of closely spaced leads; different shapes are recommended to correct bridging that has occurred. Due to patent restrictions not all manufacturers offer concave tips everywhere; in particular there are restrictions in the USA.

Older and very cheap irons typically use a bare copper tip, which is shaped with a file or sandpaper. This dissolves gradually into the solder, suffering pitting and erosion of the shape. Copper tips are sometimes filed when worn down. Iron-plated copper tips have become increasingly popular since the 1980s. Because iron is not readily dissolved by molten solder, the plated tip is more durable than a bare copper one, though it will eventually wear out and need replacing. This is especially important when working at the higher temperatures needed for modern lead-free solders. Solid iron and steel tips are seldom used because they store less heat, conduct it poorly, and rusting can break the heating element.

Iron-plated tips may feature a layer of nickel between the copper core and the iron surface. A nickel-chrome outer plating may be used further back from the very tip, as solder does not stick well to this material: this avoids solder wetting parts of the tip where it would be unwanted.

Some tips have a heater and a thermocouple-based temperature sensor embedded to facilitate a more precise temperature control (TS100 and T12, for instance).

== Cleaning ==
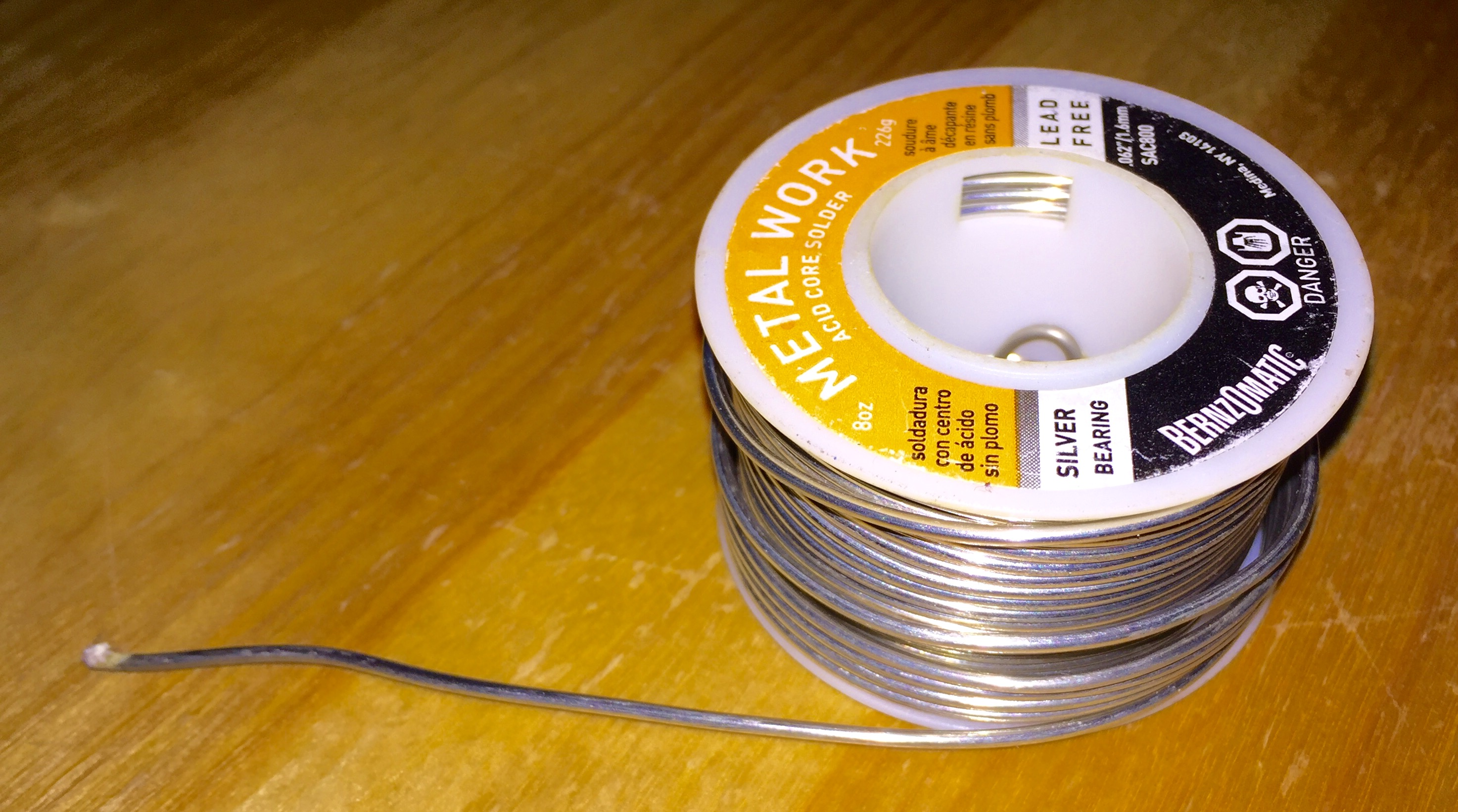
Spool of solder. 1.6mm.

When the iron tip oxidises and burnt flux accumulates on it, solder no longer wets the tip, impeding heat transfer and making soldering difficult or impossible; tips must be periodically cleaned in use. Such problems happen with all kinds of solder, but are much more severe with the lead-free solders which have become widespread in electronics work, which require higher temperatures than solders containing lead. Exposed iron plating oxidises; if the tip is kept tinned with molten solder oxidation is inhibited. A clean unoxidised tip is tinned by applying a little solder and flux.

A wet small sponge, often supplied with soldering equipment, can be used to wipe the tip. For lead-free solder a slightly more aggressive cleaning, with brass shavings, can be used. Soldering flux will help to remove oxide; the more active the flux the better the cleaning, although acidic flux used on circuit boards that is not carefully cleaned off will cause corrosion. A tip which is cleaned but not retinned is susceptible to oxidation.

Soldering iron tips are made of a copper core plated various metals including iron. The copper is used for heat transfer and the other platings are for durability. Copper is very easily corroded, eating away the tip, particularly in lead-free work; iron is not. Cleaning tips requires the removal of oxide without damaging the iron plating and exposing the copper to rapid corrosion. The use of solder already containing a small amount of copper can slow corrosion of copper tips.

In cases of severe oxidation not removable by gentler methods, abrasion with something hard enough to remove oxide but not so hard as to scratch the iron plating can be used. A brass wire scourer, brush, or wheel on a bench grinder, can be used with care. Sandpaper and other tools may be used but are likely to damage the plating.

== Safety precautions ==
=== Electro-static discharge ===
Not all soldering irons are ESD-safe.

Although some manufacturers' mains-powered models are built with the element shaft (and hence the tip) electrically connected to ground via the iron's mains lead, other models' tips may float at arbitrary voltages unless an additional grounding wire is used.

=== Lead exposure ===
Melting the solder can release toxic fumes, particularly solder with higher proportions of lead. It is recommended to work in a well-ventilated area; to avoid inhaling the toxic fumes; and to wash hands with soap after operating with a soldering iron. It is also recommended to use lead-free solder to mitigate the risks of lead exposure.

=== High temperature ===
When operating, the iron can reach temperatures in the range of 200-480°C. Never touch the heating element, since doing so while hot will cause one to contract skin burns. Make sure to switch off the device and hold it on the soldering stand when not in use - placing it directly on the workbench may cause it to make contact and damage the surface and nearby objects. Ensure that the cleaning sponge is wet while in operation.

=== Solder ejection ===
Sometimes, molten solder can "spit" or spatter, ejecting out from the wire and potentially causing damage to eyes and skin. Wearing eye protection, like safety goggles and clothing of fire-resistant material, such as cotton, and toe-closed shoes can reduce injury.

== See also ==
- Soldering station
- Brazing — Joining metals structurally by the use of a higher temperature joining alloy than solder
- ColdHeat — A resistive "instant heat" soldering iron
- Welding — Melting two objects to be joined into each other
