= Soldering station =

Multipurpose power soldering device

Contact soldering stations

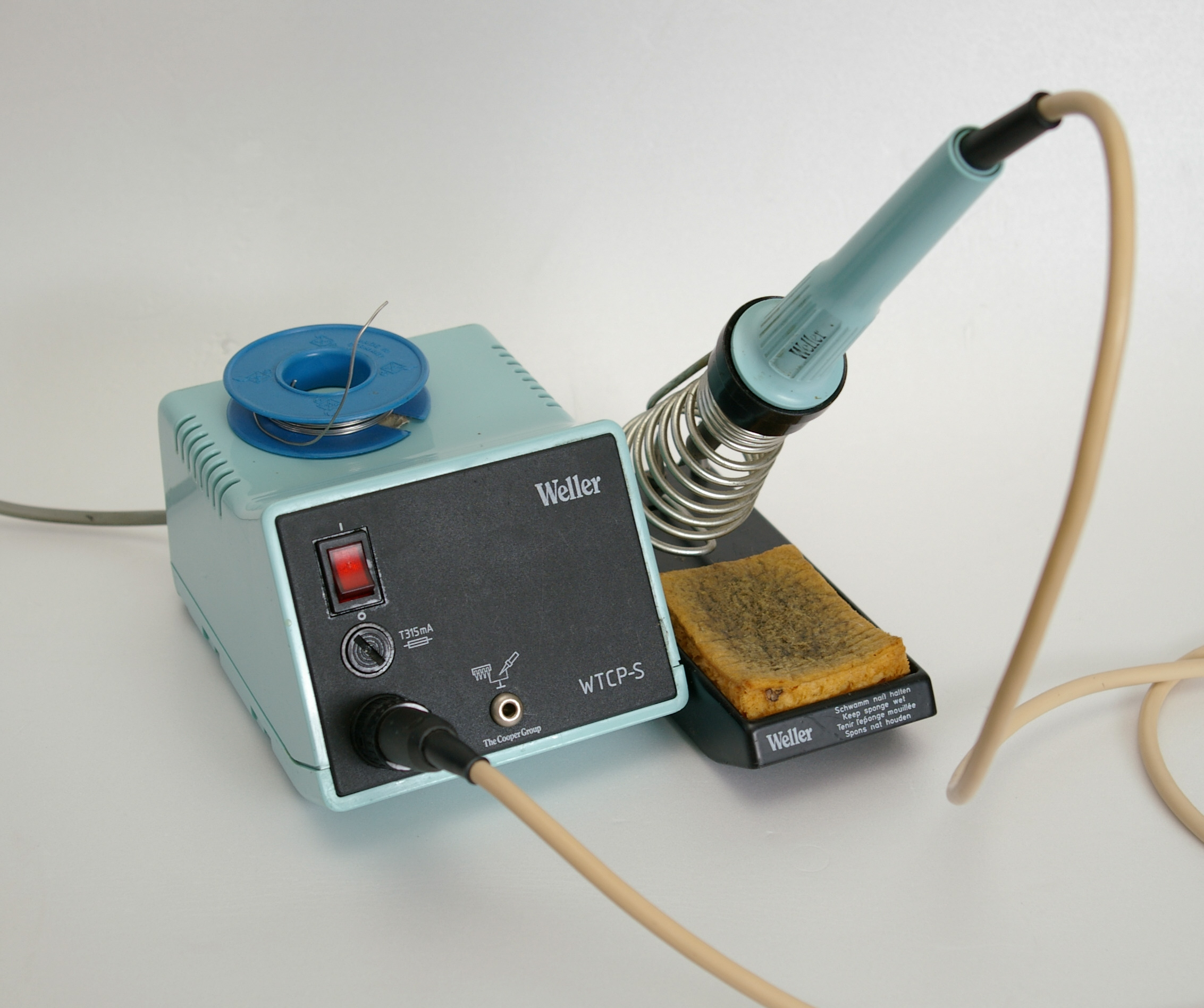
Weller WTCP-S fixed-temperature soldering station

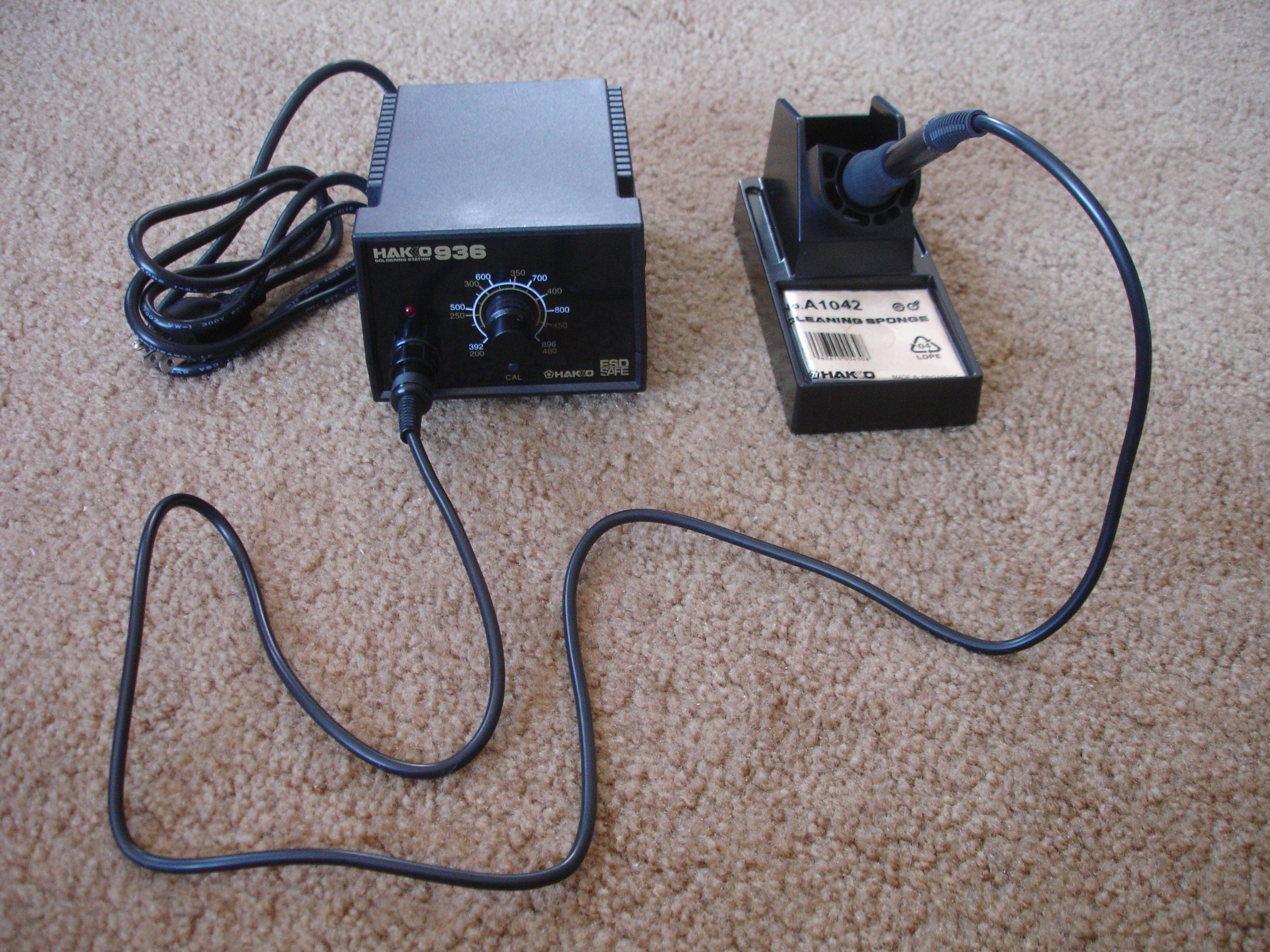
Hakko 936 ESD temperature controlled soldering station

A soldering station is a multipurpose power soldering device designed for electronic components soldering. This type of equipment is mostly used in electronics and electrical engineering. Soldering station consists of one or more soldering tools connected to the main unit, which includes the controls (temperature adjustment), means of indication, and may be equipped with an electric transformer. Soldering stations may include some accessories – holders and stands, soldering tip cleaners, etc.

Soldering stations are widely used in electronics repair workshops, electronic laboratories, in industry. Sometimes simple soldering stations are used for household applications and for hobbies.

== Soldering Station Components ==
The main soldering station elements which determine its compatibilities are soldering tools. Different tools are used for different applications and soldering stations may be equipped with more than one of them at a time. The main tools for soldering are:

- contact soldering irons;
- desoldering tweezers or SMD hot tweezers;
- desoldering gun;
- hot air gun;
- infrared heater.

Soldering iron is the most common working tool of a soldering station. Some stations may use simultaneously several soldering irons to make the process quicker and more convenient, as there is no need to change the soldering tips or readjust the station or the soldering temperature. Some stations may use some specialized soldering irons, such as ultrasonic soldering irons or induction soldering irons.

=== Soldering Irons ===
Soldering iron as a part of soldering station has a number of advantages.

==== Increased operability ====
- The operator may set the temperature according to the solder alloy in use
- Stability of the preset temperature.
- Operation mode indication, including temperature display.

==== Main unit with power supply ====
- Galvanic isolation of the heating element from the electricity network. This increases the safety of the operator and protects the components that are being soldered.
- Heating element operates under low voltage (10-30 V), increasing safety. It also prolongs the lifetime of the heating element.
- Grounding of the whole unit.
- The station has a fuse.

==== Increased user comfort ====
- The working part has smaller size and weight.
- Station design integrates soldering aid accessories: soldering iron stands, soldering tip cleaners, etc.
- Some stations have auto switch-off function.

However, most soldering stations can only be used on a desk and they usually cost more than a standalone soldering iron.

=== Desoldering Tools ===
Desoldering is a very important stage in PCB repair. It is often needed to disassemble some components just to make sure they work or check their condition. That is why it is important to detach the elements without any possible damage to them.

The means that may be integrated in soldering stations are:

SMD hot tweezers heat up and may not only melt the solder alloy but grab the needed component as well. They may have different types of tips for different applications.

Desoldering iron is usually made in a shape of a gun. It is capable of taking in the air (vacuum pickup) and solder alloy.

Non-contact heating tools include hot air and infrared heaters. They are used for SMT disassembling.

=== Hot Air Guns ===
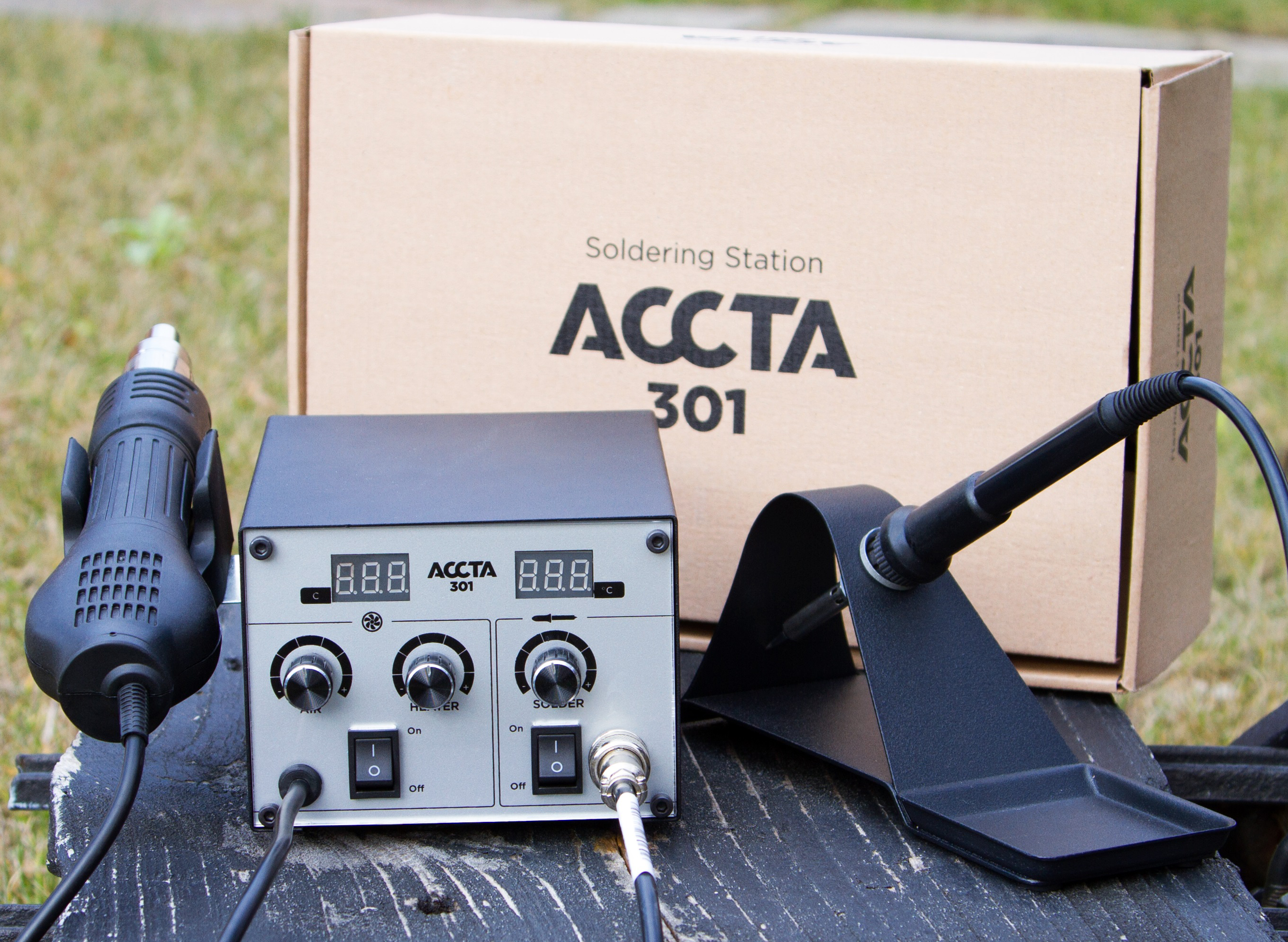
Accta 301 soldering station with hot air gun and soldering iron

They use a hot air stream for heating up the components. Hot air is focused on the certain area using special hot air nozzles. Usually soldering hot air guns are capable of providing temperatures from 100 to 480 °C.

=== Infrared Heaters ===
Soldering stations with infrared (IR) heaters are a separate type of soldering stations and differ a lot. Such stations provide high-precision soldering and the process is more like that in electronics industry. The temperature profile may be set based on the components being soldered. This minimizes the risk of components deformation or damage due to the temperature difference.

== Soldering Station Classification ==
=== Contact Soldering Stations ===
This type requires a soldering iron equipped with an electronic temperature adjustment unit. The main technical parameter of the contact soldering station is the power. The power determines the operation convenience and soldering effectiveness. The modern stations have power from 10 to 200 W and more. The most common are the models with 50-80 W power. The higher is the power the more amount of heat you may transmit for the same time. It allows reducing the temperature on the heating element to the minimal possible value for melting the solder alloy. And vice versa – the lower is the power the higher temperature you need to melt the solder. High temperature means a risk of a component overheating. Especially it concerns semiconductor components or electrolytic conductors.

According to the solder alloy used these soldering stations may be divided into two subtypes:

==== Lead-free soldering stations ====
This type of stations is characterized by heating element with a power up to 160 W. Lead-free solder alloys need higher temperatures to be melted, so the station needs more power. If the station is equipped with a temperature regulator, it may be used for operation with a traditional lead-containing solder.

=== Digital and analogue soldering stations ===
The stations may be divided into digital and analogue according to the control unit operation method.

Analogue stations have a temperature stabilization that operates as follows:

- The heating element is working till the soldering tip reaches certain temperature, then the power switches off.
- When the temperature becomes lower than a certain level the heating element is on again and the soldering tip is being heated.

The operation is ensured by the magnetoelectric relay. It is controlled by electronics and a temperature sensor. Analogue control system has an advantage – it is the cost. The disadvantage is a low operation precision that results in soldering tip overheating. This leads to problems like: electronic components overheating, often tip change.

Digital soldering station is operating using a PID regulator that is controlled by a microprocessor. Digital control method is more precise.

=== Induction soldering stations ===
Induction soldering stations are characterized by high power and excellent thermal stability. They use the technology of heating and thermal stabilization based on Curie temperature.

American manufacturer Metcal is a leader in this market segment, however there are other brands.

=== Non-contact soldering stations ===
==== Hot air soldering stations ====
Stations with hot air guns are used in cases when just a soldering iron is not enough. Disassembling microchips requires a hot air gun. SMD components soldering with hot air is much more convenient. Hot air guns usually come with special nozzles for hot air stream regulation. Popular manufacturers: Hakko, Quick, Accta, Goot, etc.

==== Rework systems ====
For professional laptop, game console and other electronics repair, special repair systems are used. These repair systems usually combine several components: hot air gun, soldering iron, desoldering gun, etc. This equipment allows effective desoldering and soldering large BGAs. These operations require special approach and certain amount of process automation. The most popular manufacturers: Ersa, Martin, Jovy Systems, Quick, Scotle.

== See also ==
- Soldering
- Soldering iron
- Soldering gun
- Solder
