= Soldering gun =

Power tool for soldering metals

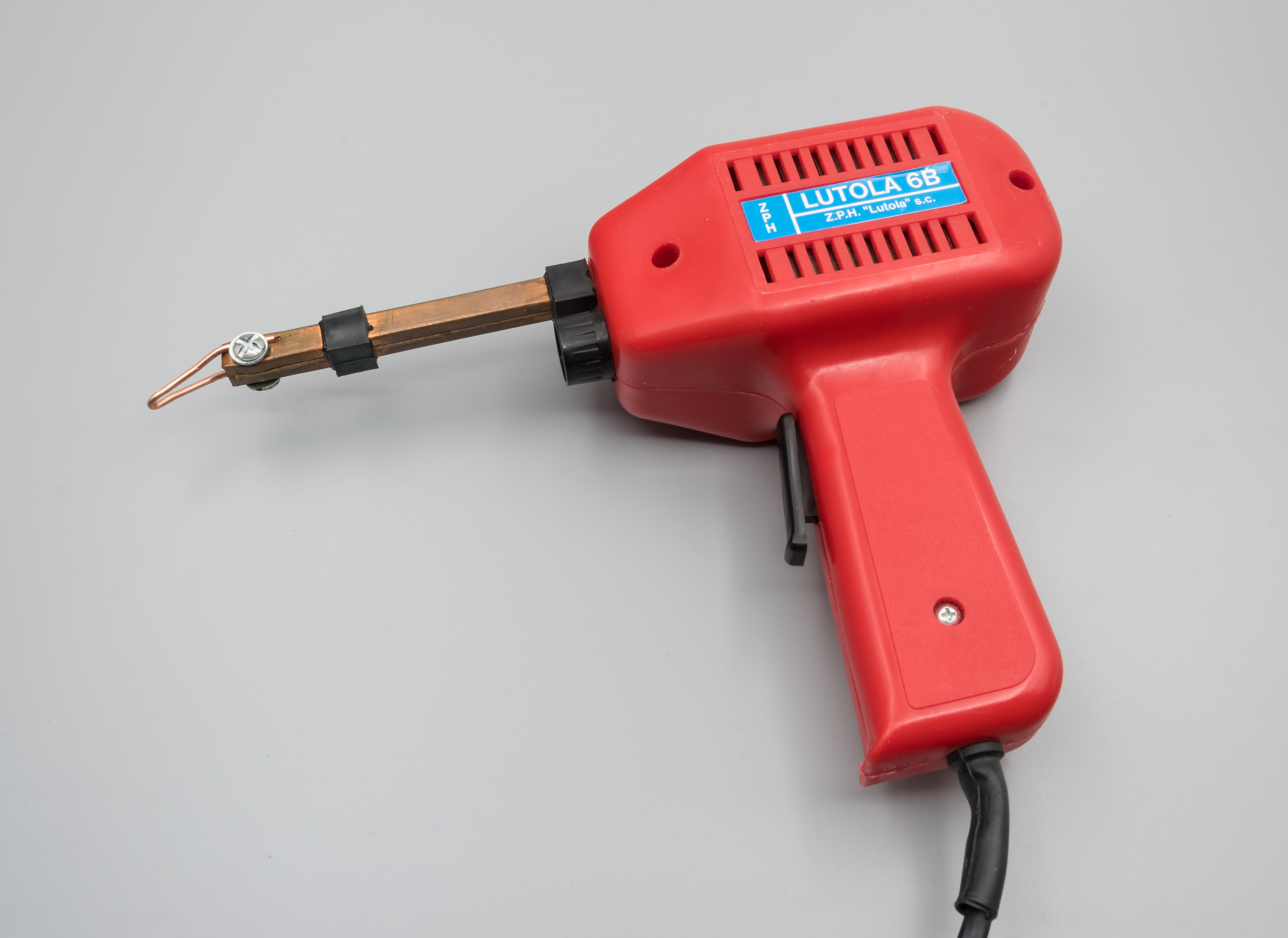
Soldering gun

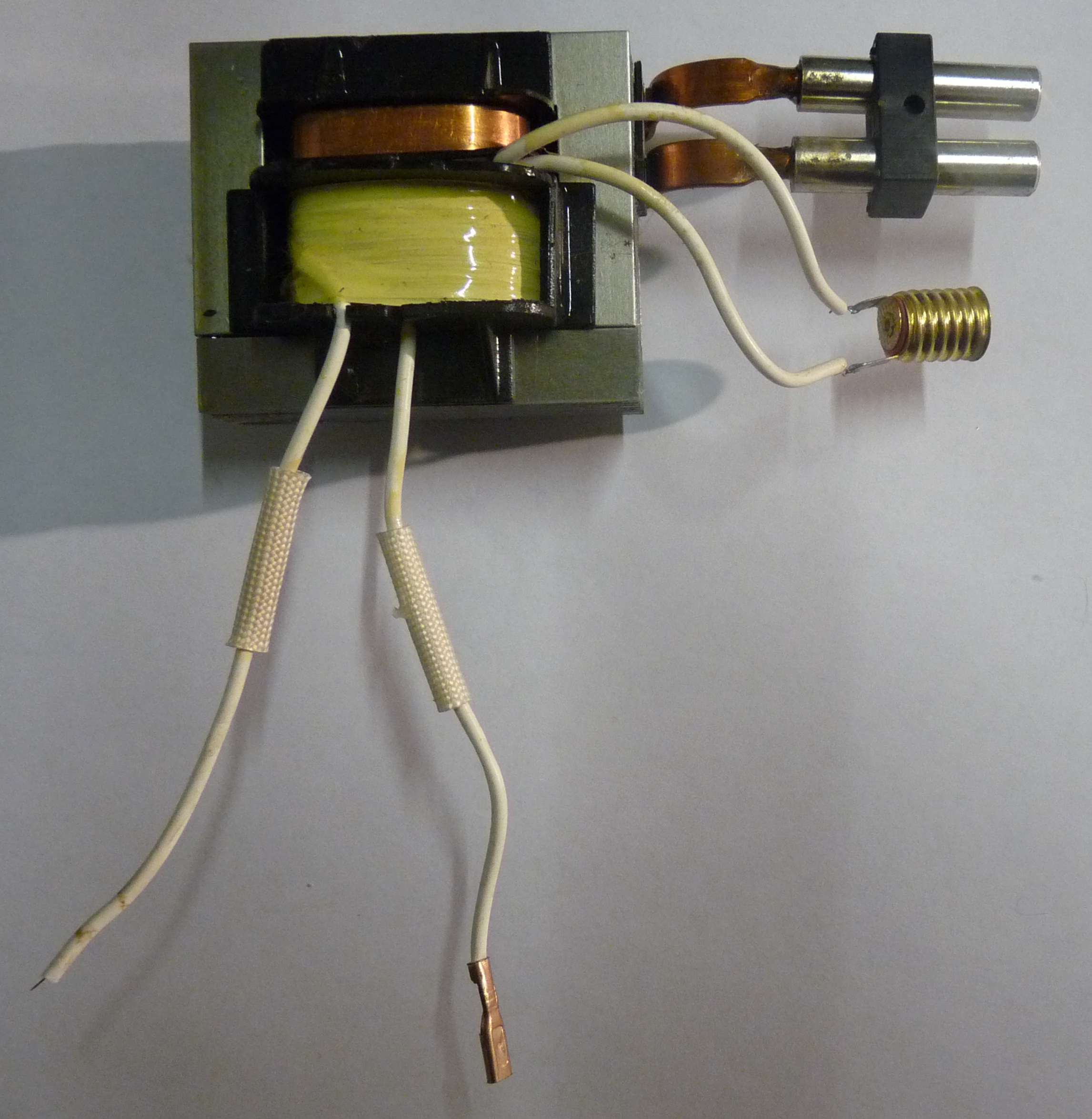
Soldering gun's parts

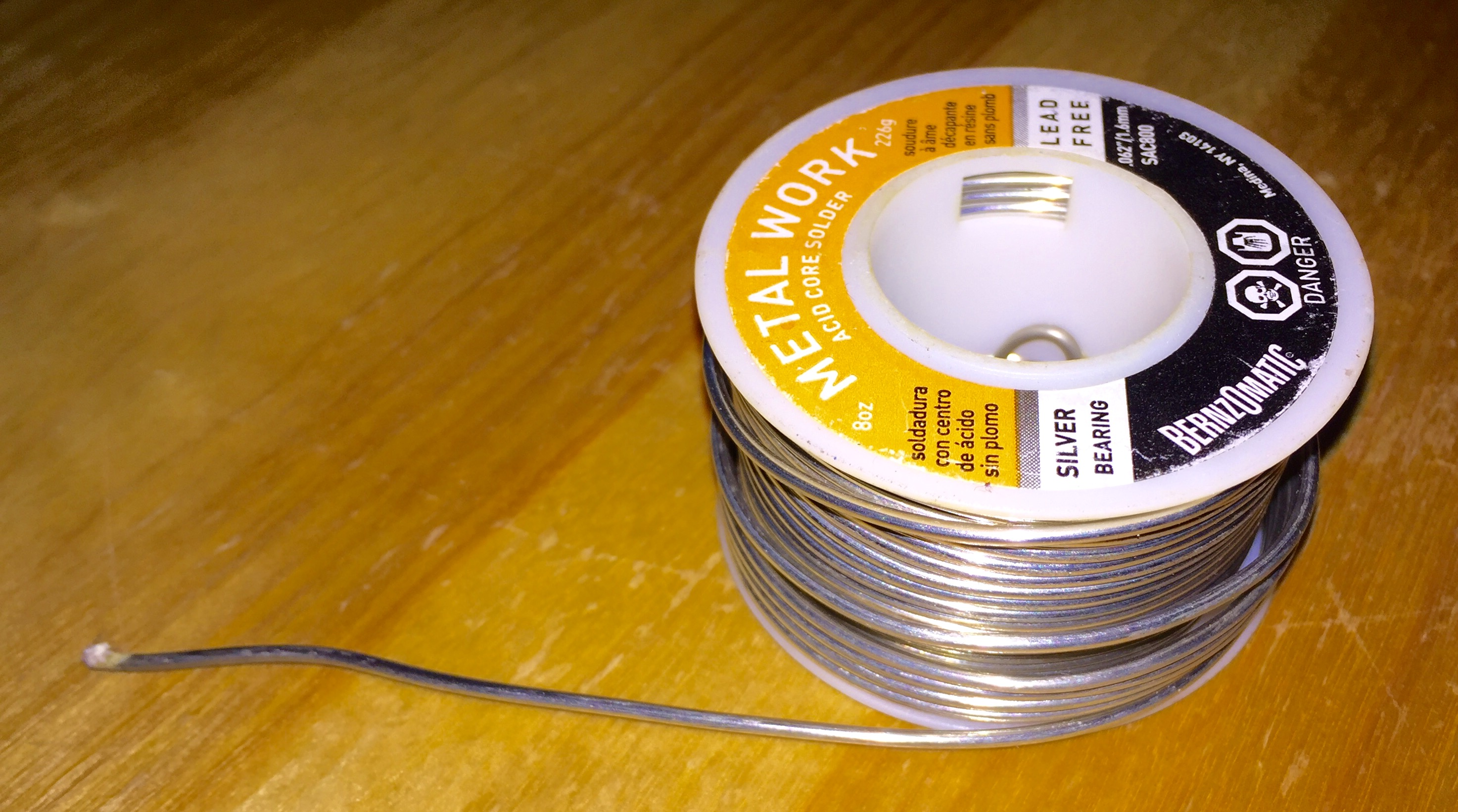
Spool of solder. 1.6mm.

A soldering gun is an approximately pistol-shaped, electrically powered tool for soldering metals using tin-based solder to achieve a strong mechanical bond with good electrical contact. The tool has a trigger-style switch so it can be easily operated with one hand. The body of the tool contains a transformer with a primary winding connected to mains electricity when the trigger is pressed, and a single-turn secondary winding of thick copper with very low resistance. A soldering tip, made of a loop of thinner copper wire, is secured to the end of the transformer secondary by screws, completing the secondary circuit. When the primary of the transformer is energized, several hundred amperes of current flow through the secondary and very rapidly heat the copper tip. Since the tip has a much higher resistance than the rest of the tubular copper winding, the tip gets very hot while the remainder of the secondary warms at a much slower rate. An additional secondary winding is often used to power a pilot lamp which illuminates the workpiece.

The soldering gun is useful when soldered joints must be made intermittently. A constant-heat device has to be set in a safe place when powered but not actually in use, to prevent damage or injury. The fast-switching gun cools quickly enough to be set down a few seconds after use.

== Applications ==
Soldering guns are used where more heat is needed than from the lower-power soldering irons. They can be used for heavy electrical connections, stained glass assembly, and light sheet-metal work. Typical soldering guns are rated at 100 to 240 watts power. A gun may include a two-stage trigger to give two heat settings. Tips designed for cutting and shaping plastic are available; soldering guns for general home use may be supplied with a kit of different tips.

The temperature of the soldering tip is regulated manually by holding the button until the solder melts, and then releasing it. When the solder is about to start solidifying, the button is pressed again, and so on. An experienced worker develops the skill to regulate the temperature according to need. Because the temperature of the tip is not automatically regulated, use of a soldering gun for joints on printed circuit boards can result in too much heat supplied to the joint, damaging the circuit board.

The copper tip slowly dissolves in the solder and eventually has to be replaced. The soldering gun generates an electromagnetic spike when the button is released, which can be a problem for electromagnetically-sensitive devices. The spike can be seen when a high-efficiency LED is soldered, as the LED flashes. The heavy magnetic field produced by the tip can attract and hold small ferrous metal pieces (screws, etc.).

== History ==
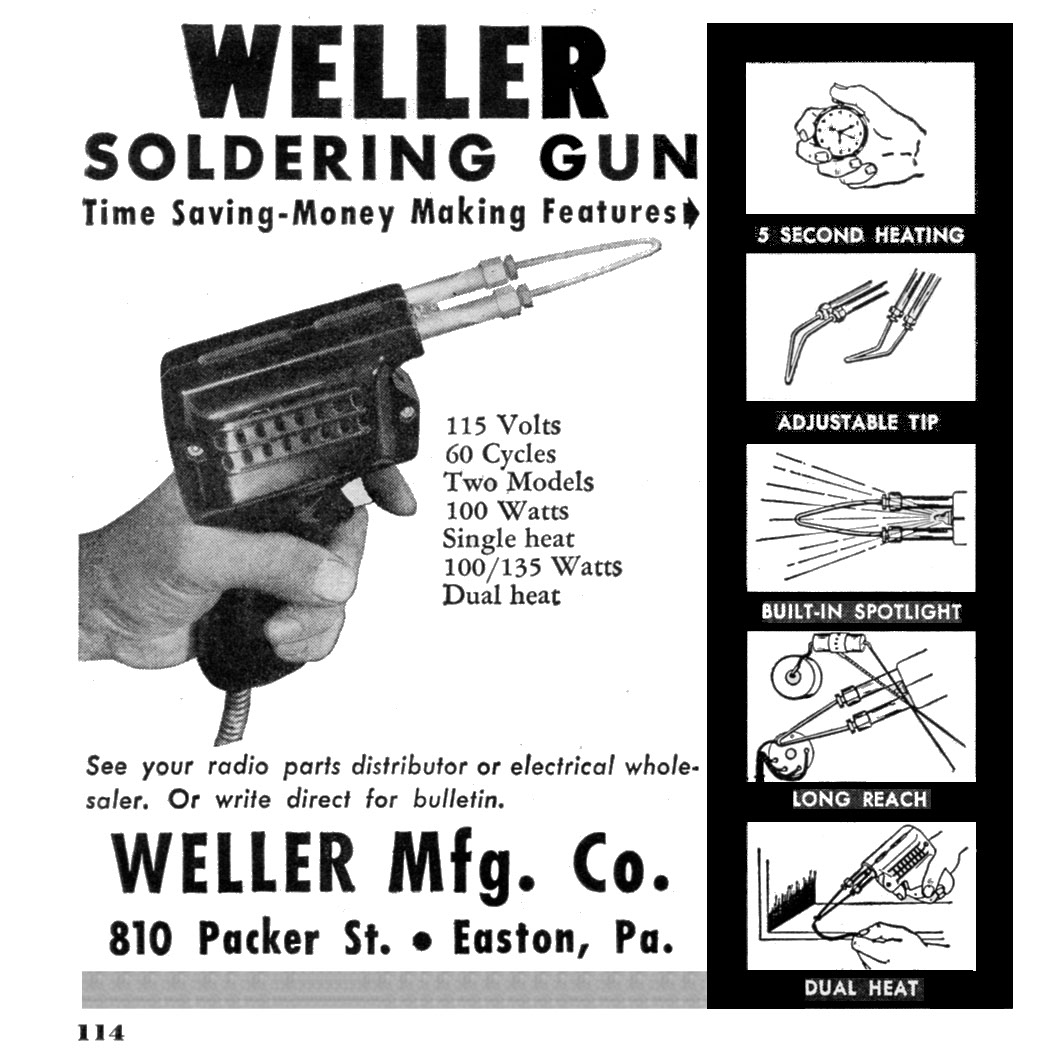
A 1948 advertisement for a Weller soldering gun

Pistol-grip electrically-heated soldering tools had been used since the 1920s. In 1941 Carl E. Weller invented and later obtained U.S. patent 2,405,866 for a transformer-based soldering tool which heated and cooled rapidly, essentially as described in this article. Weller formed a company to manufacture and sell his invention commercially in 1946. The Weller company was bought in 1970 and merged into the Cooper Industries group, retaining the Weller brand for soldering equipment.

== See also ==
- Helping hand (tool)
- Solder
- Soldering iron
