= Crocodile clip =

Device used for creating a temporary electrical connection

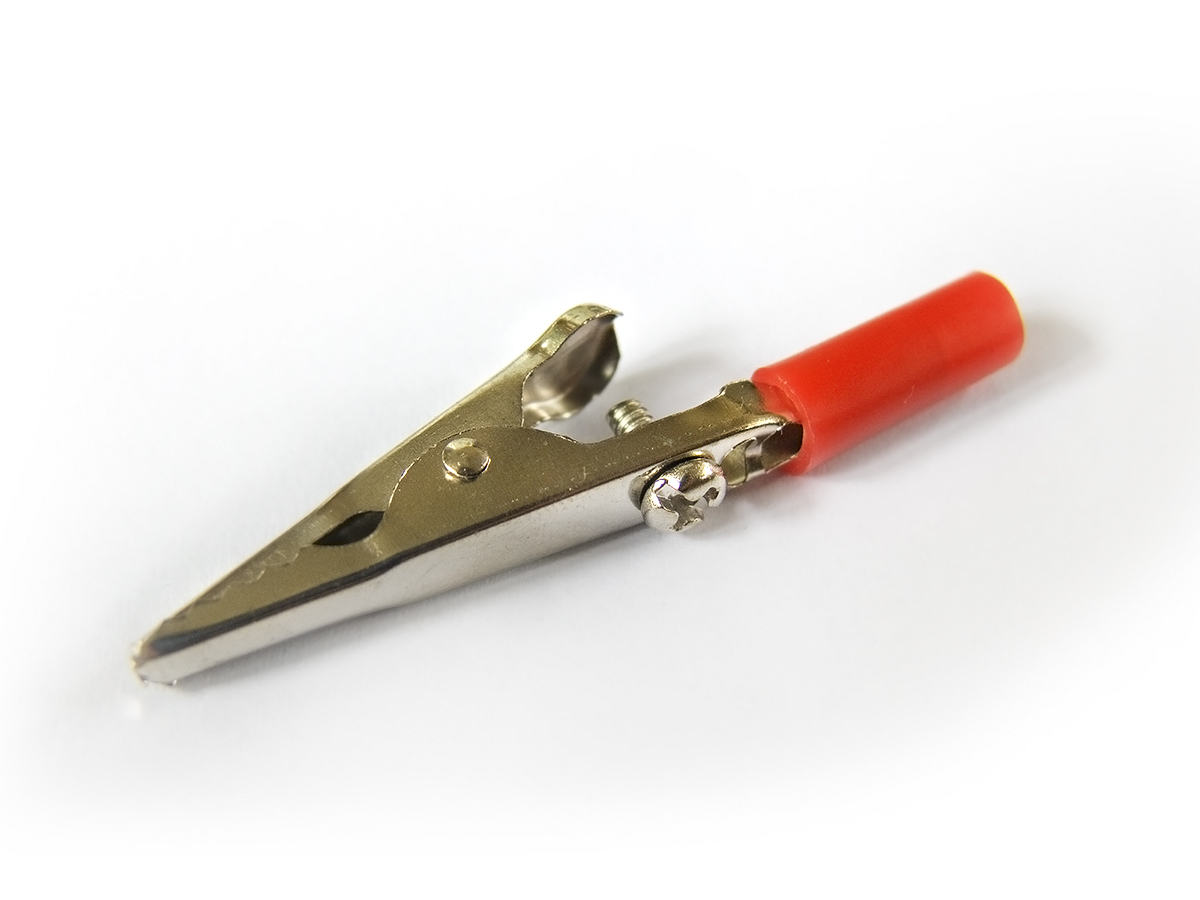
Alligator clip

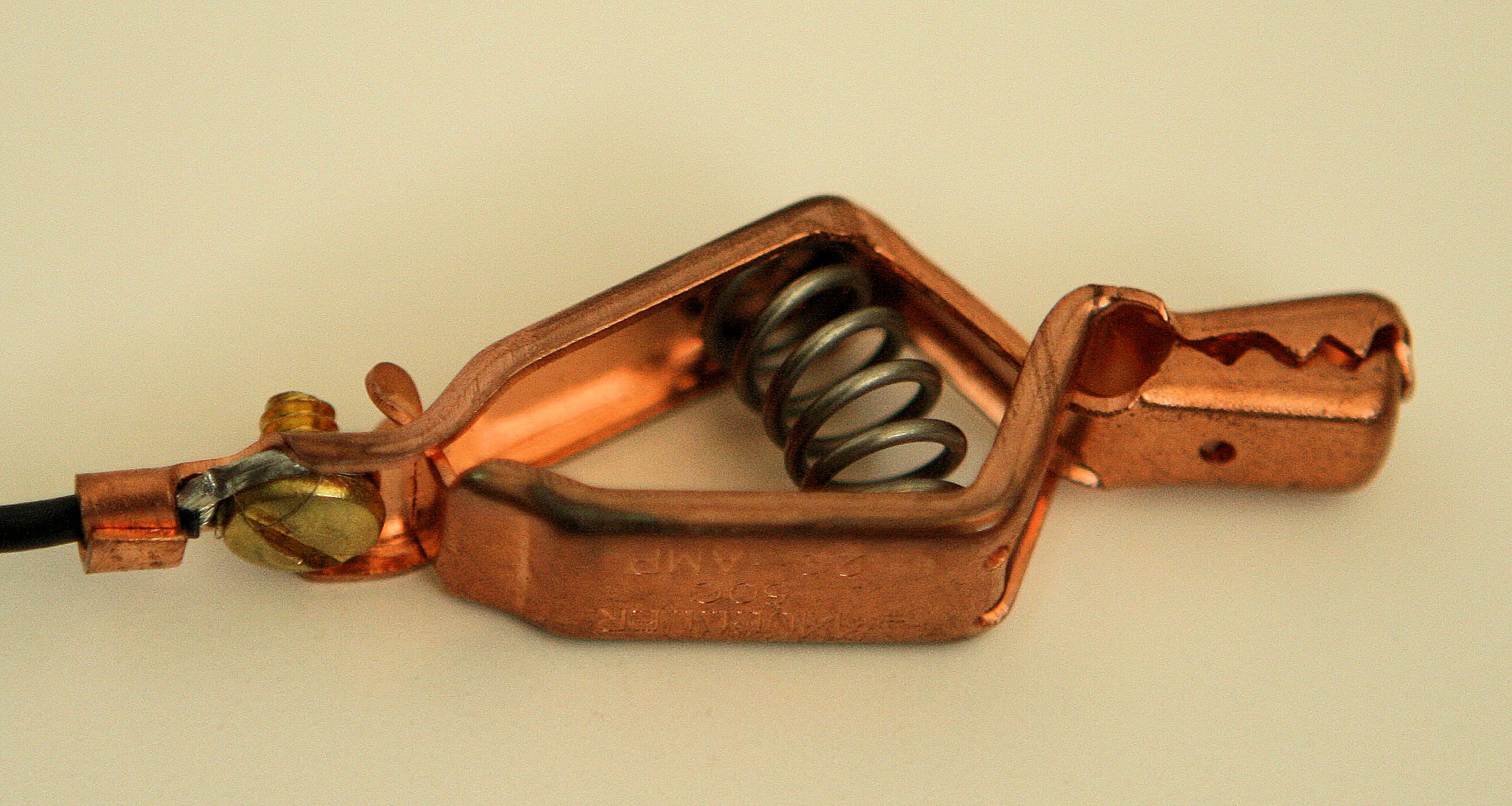
A crocodile clip manufactured by Mueller Electric. This device is a variation of Dusinberre's original crocodile clip design

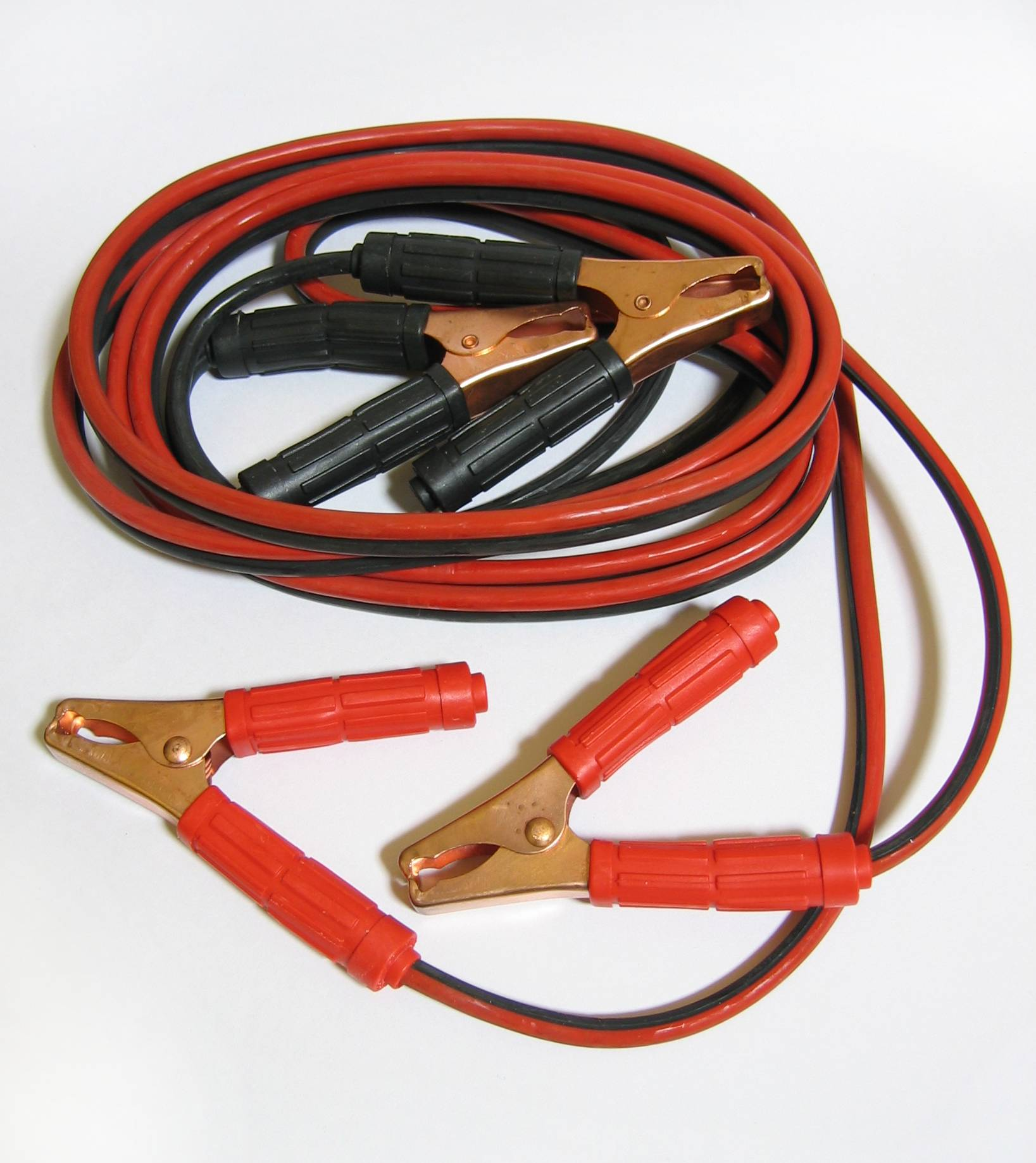
Crocodile clips, also called automotive clips, on a set of jumper cables

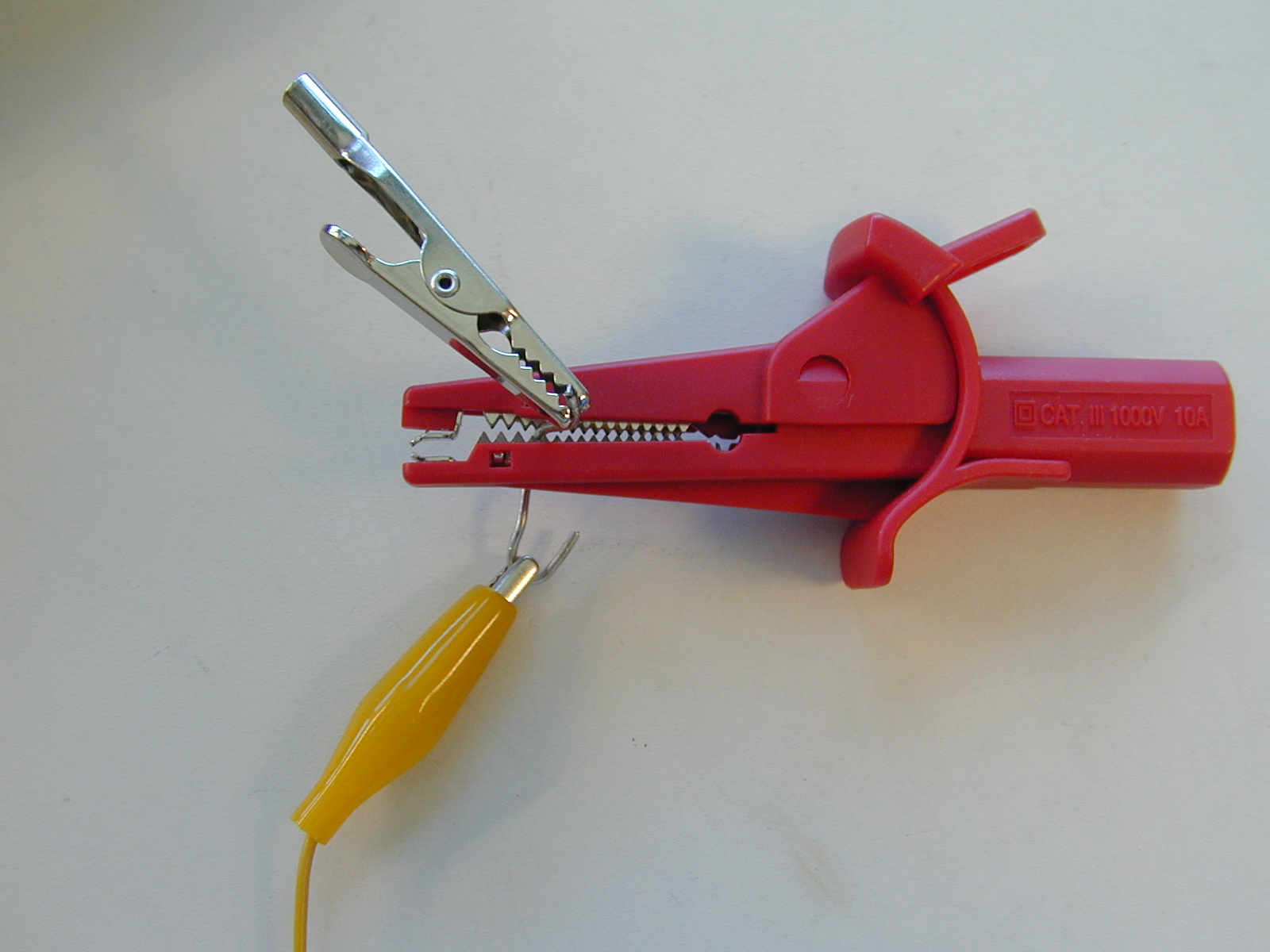
Three crocodile clips: a bare standard-sized clip; a miniature clip in a yellow plastic boot; a large red Square D multi-function clip

A crocodile clip or alligator clip is a plier-like spring-tensioned metal clip with elongated, serrated jaws that is used for creating a temporary electrical connection. This simple mechanical device gets its name from the resemblance of its jaws to those of a crocodile or alligator. It is used to clamp and grab onto a bare wire or a lead on a battery or some other electrical component. The clip's tapered, serrated jaws are forced together by a spring to grip an object. A Kelvin clip is a special form of crocodile clip whose jaws are insulated from each other, allowing two isolated wires to connect to a single test point. This enables 4-wire measurement of circuits with very low resistances. When manufactured for electronics testing and evaluation, one jaw of the clip is typically permanently crimped or soldered to a wire, or is bent to form the inner tubular contact of a ~4 mm (0.16 in) female banana jack, enabling quick non-permanent connection between a circuit under test and laboratory equipment or to another electrical circuit. The clip is typically covered by a plastic shroud or "boot" to prevent accidental short-circuits.

Small versions, ranging in size from 15–40 mm (0.59–1.57 in) in length, are used in electrical laboratory work.

Large versions of these clips, called automotive clips or battery clamps, are made of solid copper for low electrical resistance, and are used with thick insulated copper cables to make connections between automobile batteries. These jumper cables (a.k.a. 'jump leads') are capable of delivering hundreds of amperes of current needed to directly power an automobile starter motor, or to transfer energy from a charged lead–acid battery to a discharged one.

== History ==
The alligator clip was first introduced to the founder of the Mueller Electric Company, the primary producer of crocodile clips, by John H. Williams in 1906. It was introduced as a wire with a lightbulb in the middle, with a clip on either end of the wire. The clip was intended for use by electricians, and would allow them to easily tap into a live wire to power a portable light. The clip was mostly covered by rubber tubing as insulation.

Several metal clip designs working on the same principle were patented in the early 20th century. A type of a crocodile clip cutting through the wire insulation was patented by Harry Frankel from New York in 1903, and another design was developed by Westinghouse Electric Corporation engineer George Brown Dusinberre, who patented it in 1909, and later was hired by Ralph S. Mueller & Co. to refine the design, with a later version patented in 1921.

Dusinberre's redesign was significantly cheaper than Williams' initial design. While Mueller approved of the design, Williams was strongly opposed to any changes to the original design. While Dusinberre offered to write Mueller as the co-inventor for his improved design while filing the patent, Mueller declined as he believed it was not his idea.

The first models produced by Muller and Dusinberre's partnership, R.S. Mueller & Company, were steel coated with zinc. This combination of metals was easily soiled, so zinc was swapped out for nickel plating. The success of the crocodile clips is largely credited to Charles Kettering's invention of the electric self-starter for motor vehicles. As automobile manufacturers began using this technology initially intended for Cadillacs, a need was produced for something that could connect batteries in storage to a charger. Mueller produced a larger version, for automobiles, of the crocodile clips referred to commonly as jumper cables and a smaller version for motorcycles.

Dusinberre eventually lost interest in the company and allowed Mueller to buy out his shares for $52,300. The company was renamed Mueller Electric.

== Specifications ==
The United States Defense Logistics Agency specifies several types of electrical clips in Commercial Item Description (CID) A-A-59466. In this CID document, crocodile clips are designated type CC, alligator clips are designated types TCx, and other types of electrical clips have various other, unique designations.

== Other uses ==
- Dentistry: crocodile clips are often used on the ends of a cord in dental offices to attach a protective bib over the patient's clothing.
- Laboratory: crocodile clips are frequently used to quickly and cheaply assemble or modify experimental circuits. They are useful for connecting components to wires.
- Education: like their laboratory use, crocodile clips are sometimes used with batteries, small lightbulbs and other small electrical devices in schools to teach students about electricity.
- Fencing: crocodile clips are used in fencing to connect to participants' lamé vests to touch-detection systems.
- Hobby: crocodile clips can be used as miniature clamps to hold items together for gluing or soldering (e.g., Helping hands tool or Clothespin).
- Camping: crocodile clips may be designed to attach a rope to a tarp or other sheet of material. (While this serves the same purpose as a grommet, it may lead to premature wear at the point of attachment.)
- Drug use: as a roach clip for holding burning cannabis to avoid burning fingers.
- Erotic use: as a clamp upon one's nipples for sexual gratification. See nipple clamp for more information on this usage.
- Film/animation: useful for airborne scenes in possible stop-motion or holding models of any sort in mid air.
- Electronics: useful as a heat sink while soldering heat-sensitive devices.
- Mechanic/tradie: to charge, maintain or jump a battery or vehicle, to power corded power tools, welder or compressor for pneumatic tools off battery. Batteries in parallel or series, maybe as a buffer for generator or alternator.
