= Jumper cable =

Electric cable to connect two rail or road vehicles

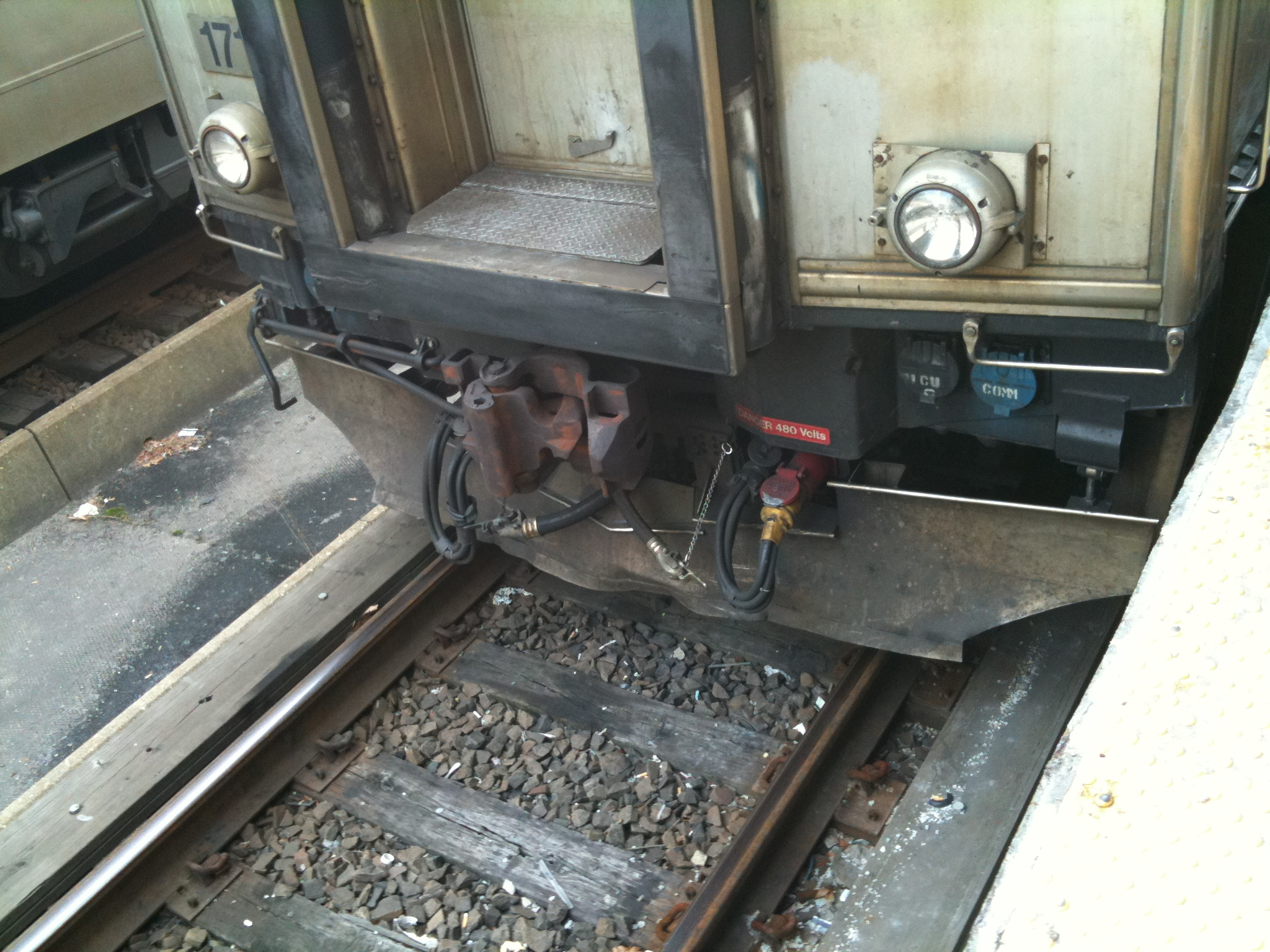
MBTA Commuter Rail car with U.S. standard head end power electrical connection cables.

Jumper cables, booster cables or jumper leads are electric cables to connect two rail or road vehicles.

== Rail ==
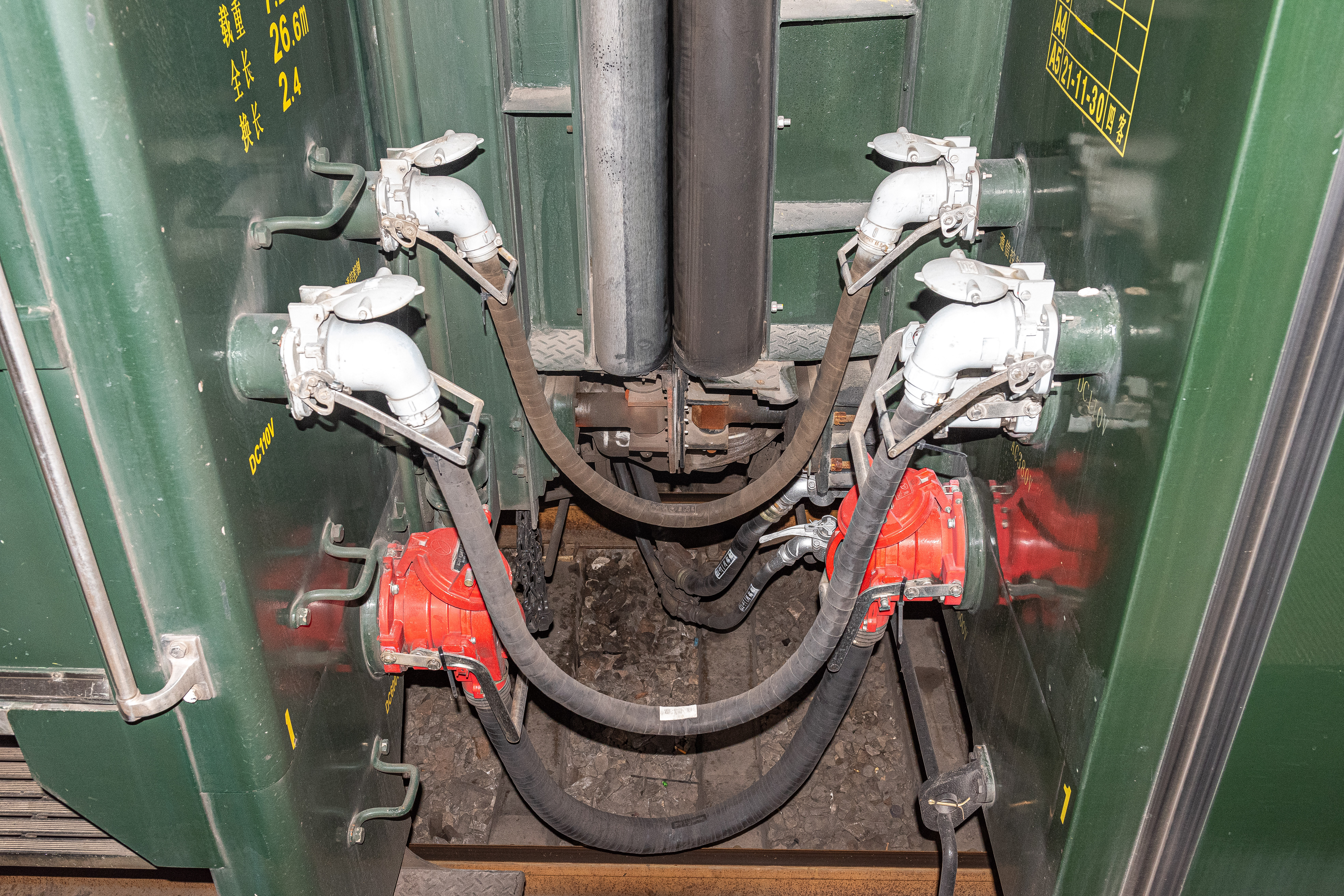
Jumper cables between two China Railway coaches

Jumper cables are between the locomotive, the railroad cars and the cab car or the driving van trailer on push-pull trains for multiple-unit train control and the transmission of lower voltage electricity (head end power).

== Road ==
Jumper cables are electrical cables between the road tractor and a semi-trailer or a full trailer or the electrical cables between an automobile and any trailer.

== Jump starting ==
A car with a "dead" (discharged) battery can be made to start by supplying it with power from an external source, such as the battery of another car. The jump leads used to make the necessary temporary connection are also commonly called "jumper cables". These usually are equipped at the ends with alligator clips.
