= Helping hand (tool) =

Adjustable jig to hold items being worked on

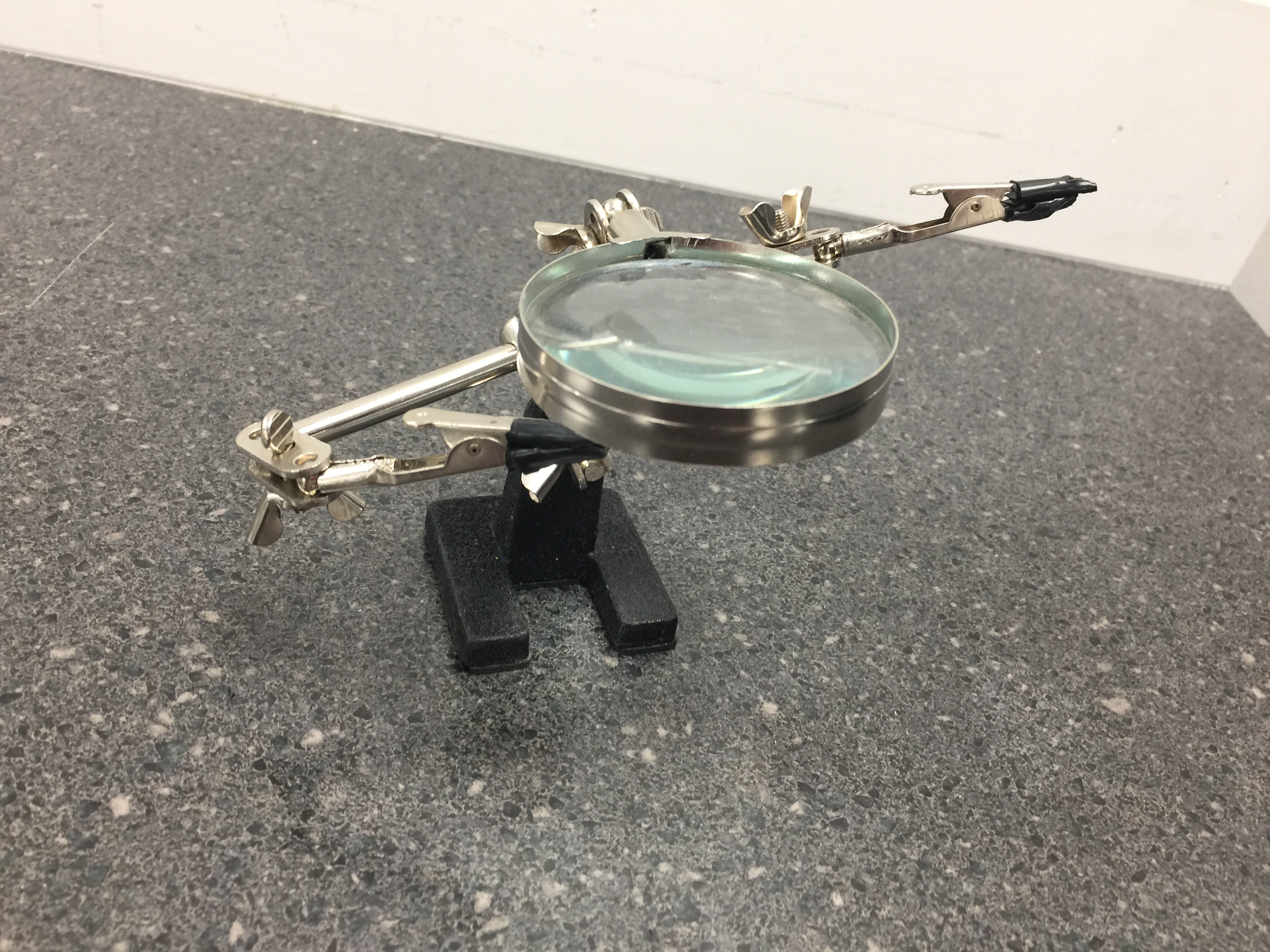
A typical helping hand

A helping hand, also known as a third hand, soldering hand, or X-tra Hands, is a type of extremely adjustable jig used in soldering and craftwork to hold materials near each other so that the user can work on them.

== Description ==
A commonly produced version consists of a weighted base, a pair of twice-adjustable arms ending in crocodile clips, and optionally a magnifying glass, held together by flexible joints. It is usual to work with an additional table lamp and there are also some third-hand models, with light already incorporated.

== Purpose ==
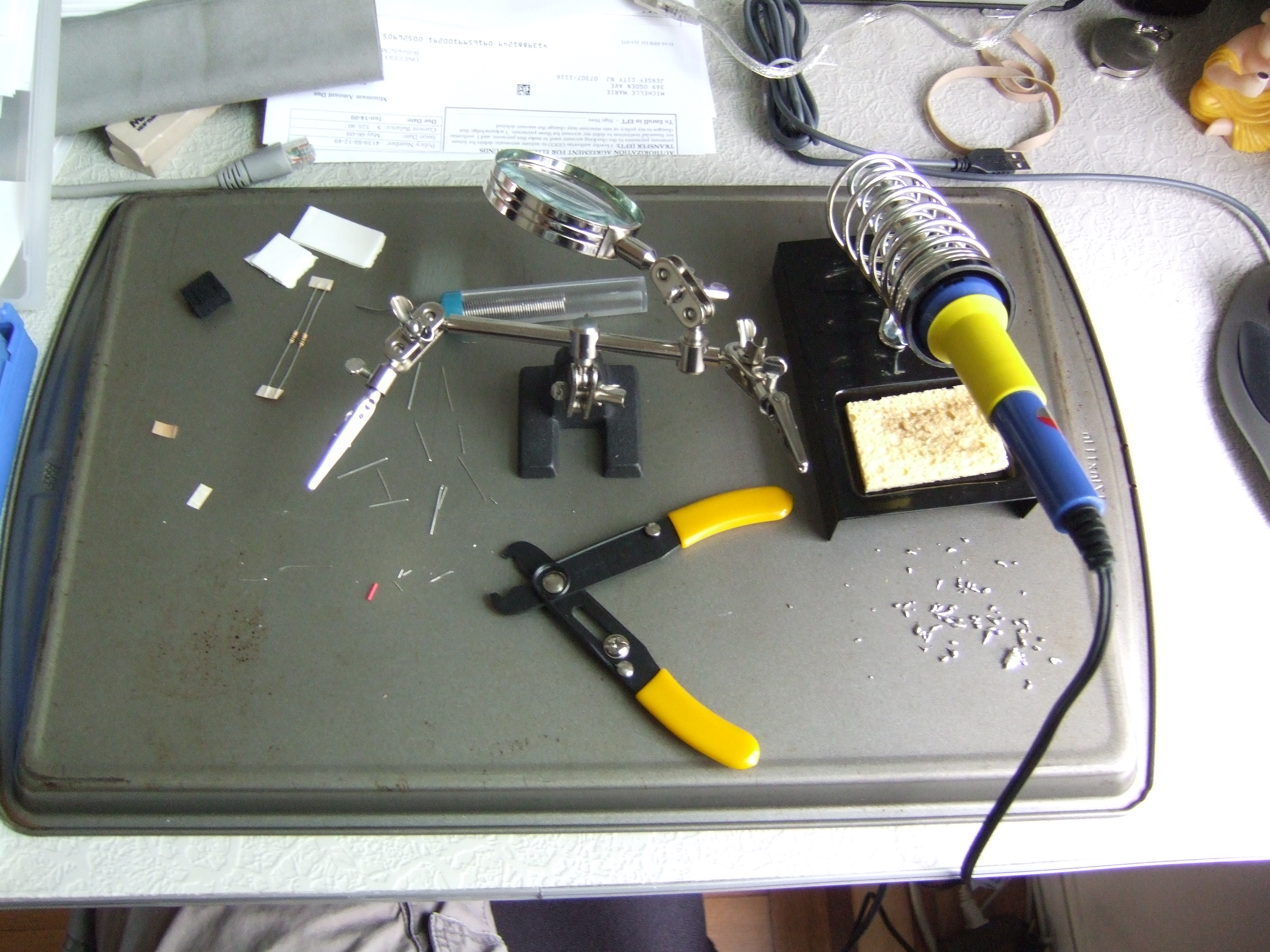
Soldering station with a helping hand

The clips are used to hold a light workpiece in place while the joints allow the user to change the position or angle. Sometimes helping hands are augmented with modules from the adjustable coolant hose systems used with machine tools.

== Similar instruments ==
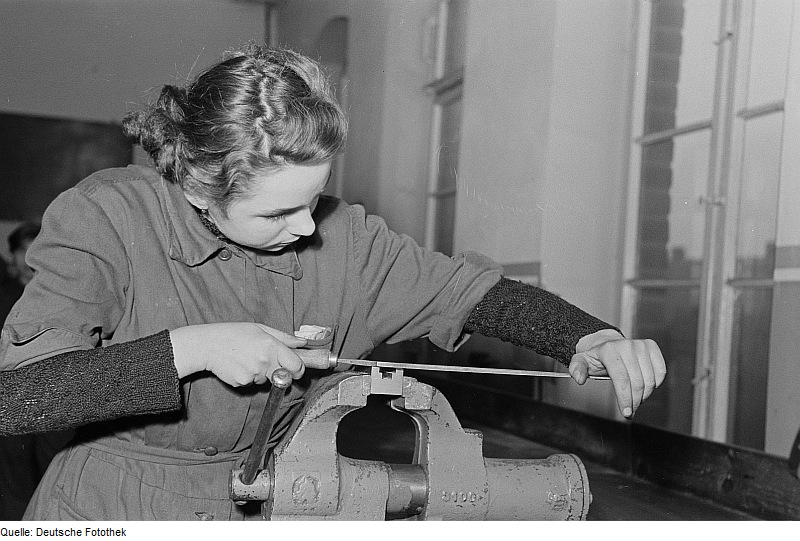
The principle of using a helping hand requires the fixation of a work piece, so that the user can use his body or extremities with total freedom of movement. A similar example is a vise.

There are various types of hand tools and similar instruments for assistance or temporary support for work, crafts and even for other tools, such as:

- Clamp
- Retort stand
- Band clamp
- Tie down strap
- Cable tie
- Rubber band
- Clothespin
- Tourniquet
- Neodymium magnet
- Vise
- Pipe clamp
- Utility clamp
- Locking pliers

== Bibliography ==
1. Odendahl, Manuel - Finn, Julian - Wenger, Alex: Arduino. Physical Computing für Bastler, Designer und Geeks. (Microcontroller-Programmierung für alle. Rapid Prototyping. Mit kompletter Programmiersprachenreferenz.). 2. Auflage. O'Reilly, Köln. 2010, ISBN 978-3-89721-995-3, P. 69
2. Millán Gómez, Simón (2006). Procedimientos de Mecanizado. Madrid: Editorial Paraninfo. ISBN 84-9732-428-5
3. Henning Ahlers: Spannmittel in: Taschenbuch der Werkzeugmaschinen, Carl Hanser Verlag, 2015. ISBN 978-3-446-43816-3
4. Perovic, Bozina. Vorrichtungen im Werkzeugmaschinenbau – Grundlagen, Berechnung und Konstruktion, Springer, 2013
5. Bohne, René. Making things wearable: intelligente Kleidung selber schneidern. O'Reilly. 2012. ISBN 978-3-86899-191-8, P. 121

== See also ==
- Ergonomics
- User-centered design
- Degrees of freedom (engineering)
- Apparatus
- Easel
- Soldering station
- Volume animation (Stop motion)
