= Selective soldering =

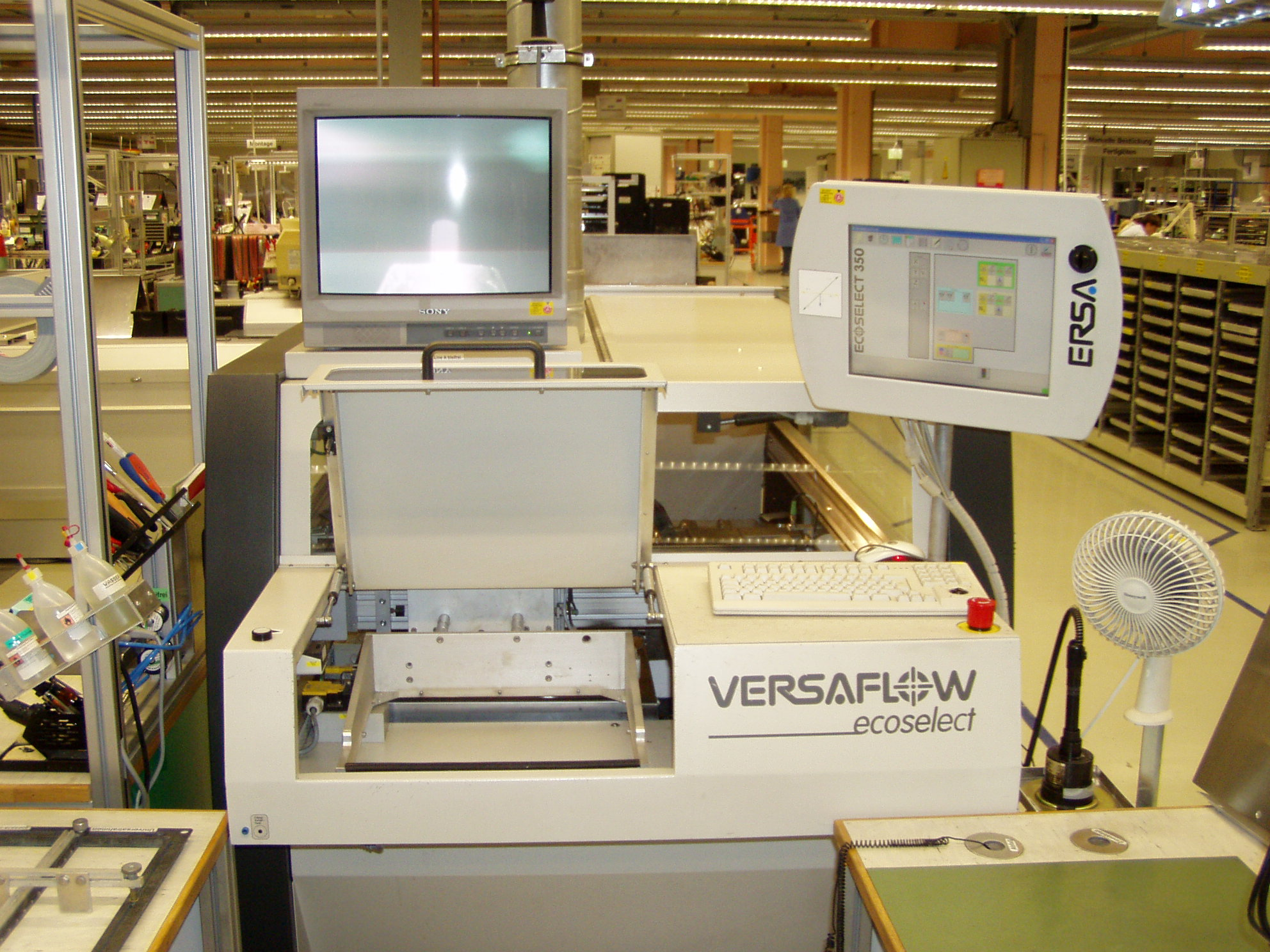
Selective soldering machine

Selective soldering is the process of selectively soldering components to printed circuit boards and molded modules that could be damaged by the heat of a reflow oven or wave soldering in a traditional surface-mount technology (SMT) or through-hole technology assembly processes. This usually follows an SMT oven reflow process; parts to be selectively soldered are usually surrounded by parts that have been previously soldered in a surface-mount reflow process, and the selective-solder process must be sufficiently precise to avoid damaging them.

== Processes ==
Assembly processes used in selective soldering include:

- Selective aperture tooling over wave solder: These tools mask off areas previously soldered in the SMT reflow soldering process, exposing only those areas to be selectively soldered in the tool's aperture or window. The tool and printed circuit board (PCB) assembly are then passed over wave soldering equipment to complete the process. Each tool is specific to a PCB assembly.
- Mass selective dip solder fountain: A variant of selective-aperture soldering in which specialized tooling (with apertures to allow solder to be pumped through it) represent the areas to be soldered. The PCB is then presented over the selective-solder fountain; all selective soldering of the PCB is soldered simultaneously as the board is lowered into the solder fountain. Each tool is specific to a PCB assembly.
- Miniature wave selective solder fountain(s): This typically uses a round miniature pumped solder wave, similar to the end of a pencil or crayon, to sequentially solder the PCB. The process is slower than the two previous methods, but more accurate. The PCB may be fixed, and the wave solder pot moved underneath the PCB; alternately, the PCB may be articulated over a fixed wave or solder bath to undergo the selective-soldering process. Unlike the first two examples, this process is toolless.
- Laser Selective Soldering System: A new system, able to import CAD-based board layouts and use that data to position a laser to directly solder any point on the board. Its advantages are the elimination of thermal stress, its non-contact quality, consistent high-quality solder joints and flexibility. Soldering time averages one second per joint; stencils and solder masks may be eliminated from the circuit board to reduce manufacturing costs.

Less-common selective soldering processes include:

- Hot-iron solder with wire-solder feed
- Induction solder with paste-solder, solder-laden pads or preforms and hot gas (including hydrogen), with a number of methods of presenting the solder

Other selective soldering applications are non-electronic, such as lead-frame attachment to ceramic substrates, coil-lead attachment, SMT attachment (such as LEDs to PCBs) and fire sprinklers (where the fuse is low-temperature solder alloys).

Regardless of the selective soldering equipment used, there are two types of selective flux applicators: spray and dropjet fluxers. The spray fluxer applies atomized flux to a specific area, while the dropjet fluxer is more precise; the choice depends on the circumstances surrounding the soldering application.

=== Miniature wave selective solder fountain ===
The miniature wave selective solder fountain type is widely used, yielding good results if the PCB design and manufacturing process are optimized. Key requirements for selective fountain type soldering are:

Process

- Nozzle diameter selection according to solder-joint geometry, nearby component clearance, component lead height and wettable or non-wettable nozzle
- Solder temperature: Set value or actual value on plated through-hole part.
- Contact time
- Preheating
- Flux type: No-clean, organic-based; method of fluxing (spray or dropjet)
- Soldering: Drag, dip or angle method

Solder temperatures are typically lower for tin-lead alloys and 250–270 °C for common lead-free SAC alloys in selective soldering pots, with optimum around 265 °C ± 5 °C for many low-silver variants to ensure proper hole filling and minimize dross.

Design

- Temperature requirement (for soldered part) and component selection
- Nearby SMD through-hole component clearance
- Ratio of component pin diameter to plated through-hole
- Component lead length
- Thermal decoupling
- Solder masking (green masking) distance from component pad

== Drop-Jet ==
The Drop-Jet is an Electromechanical device which is capable of depositing a droplet of flux on demand onto a surface such as a Printed Circuit Board and or component pin.

== Thermal profiling ==
The thermal profile of the selective process is critical as with other common automated soldering techniques. Topside temperature measurements within the pre-heat stage must be verified as with conventional flow solder machine, additionally flux activation must be verified as sufficient. As number of miniature profiling dataloggers are now available to make the process more simple such as the Solderstar Pro units.

== Selective solder optimization ==
A number of fixtures are available to allow daily checking of the selective solder process, these instruments allow the verification of machine parameters to be performed on a periodic basis. Parameters such as contact time, X/Y speeds, nozzle wave height and profile temperature can all be measured.

== Use of nitrogen atmosphere ==
Selective soldering is normally undertaken in a nitrogen atmosphere. This prevents oxidation of the fountain surface and results in better wetting. Less flux is needed with less left-over residue. The use of nitrogen results in clean, shiny joints without the need for PCB cleaning or brushing.
