= Nepcon =

NEPCON is a trade event for the electronics manufacturing industry. It is held annually in several parts of the world. In the United States, for instance, the event called NEPCON West had a 37-year run and ended in 2002. This trade show has been described as the grandfather of all electronics manufacturing trade shows. The case is the same for NEPCON UK, which is considered Britain's largest annual electronics exhibition.

Nepcon China is an annual Surface-mount technology (SMT) trade event in China that features a comprehensive range of SMT products and technology. The 18th edition of the event was held from 8 to 11 April 2008. The 2019 exhibit was scheduled at the Shanghai World Expo Center from April 24 to 26.
