= Specification for human interface for semiconductor manufacturing equipment =

This specification is usually called SEMI E95-0200 standard. It was originally published in February 2000, and the latest technical revision is SEMI E95-1101.

This standard addresses the area of processing content with the direct intention of developing common software standards, so that problems involving operator training, operation specifications, and efficient development can be resolved more easily.

== See also ==
Semiconductor Equipment and Materials International
