= Desoldering =

Removal of solder and components from a circuit board

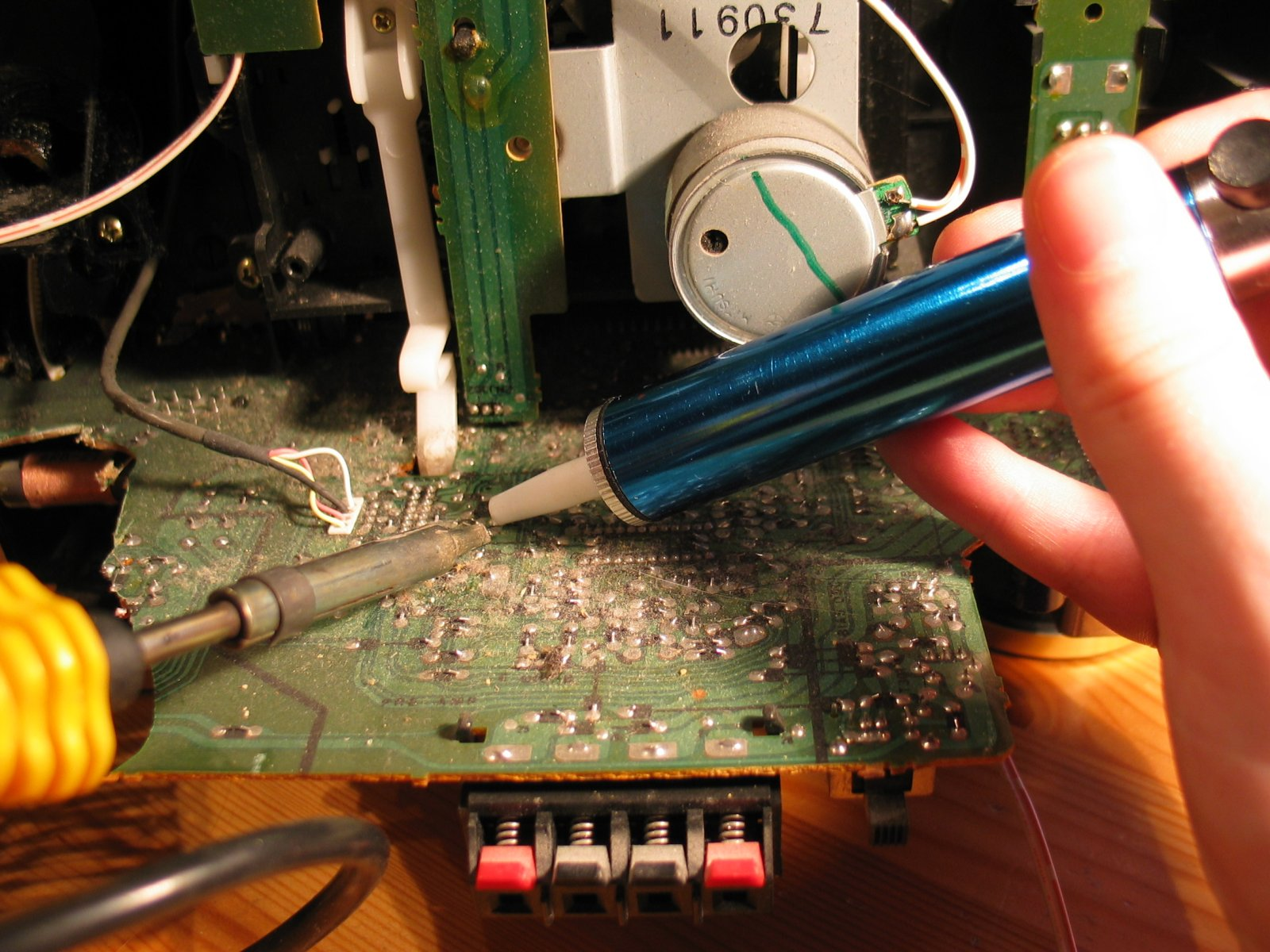
Solders can be removed using a vacuum plunger (on the right) and a soldering iron.

In electronics, desoldering is the removal of soldered components from a circuit board for troubleshooting, repair, replacement, and salvage. Desoldering involves breaking the soldered connection between component and board, typically by reflowing and removing the solder, allowing the component to be removed and potentially replaced if needed.

Specific tools and techniques used for desoldering a component vary depending on the type of component (through-hole or surface-mount) and on whether the component needs to be recovered with or without damage. These include the use of soldering irons or heat guns to reflow the solder, and vacuum pumps or desoldering braid to remove the melted solder.

== Tools ==
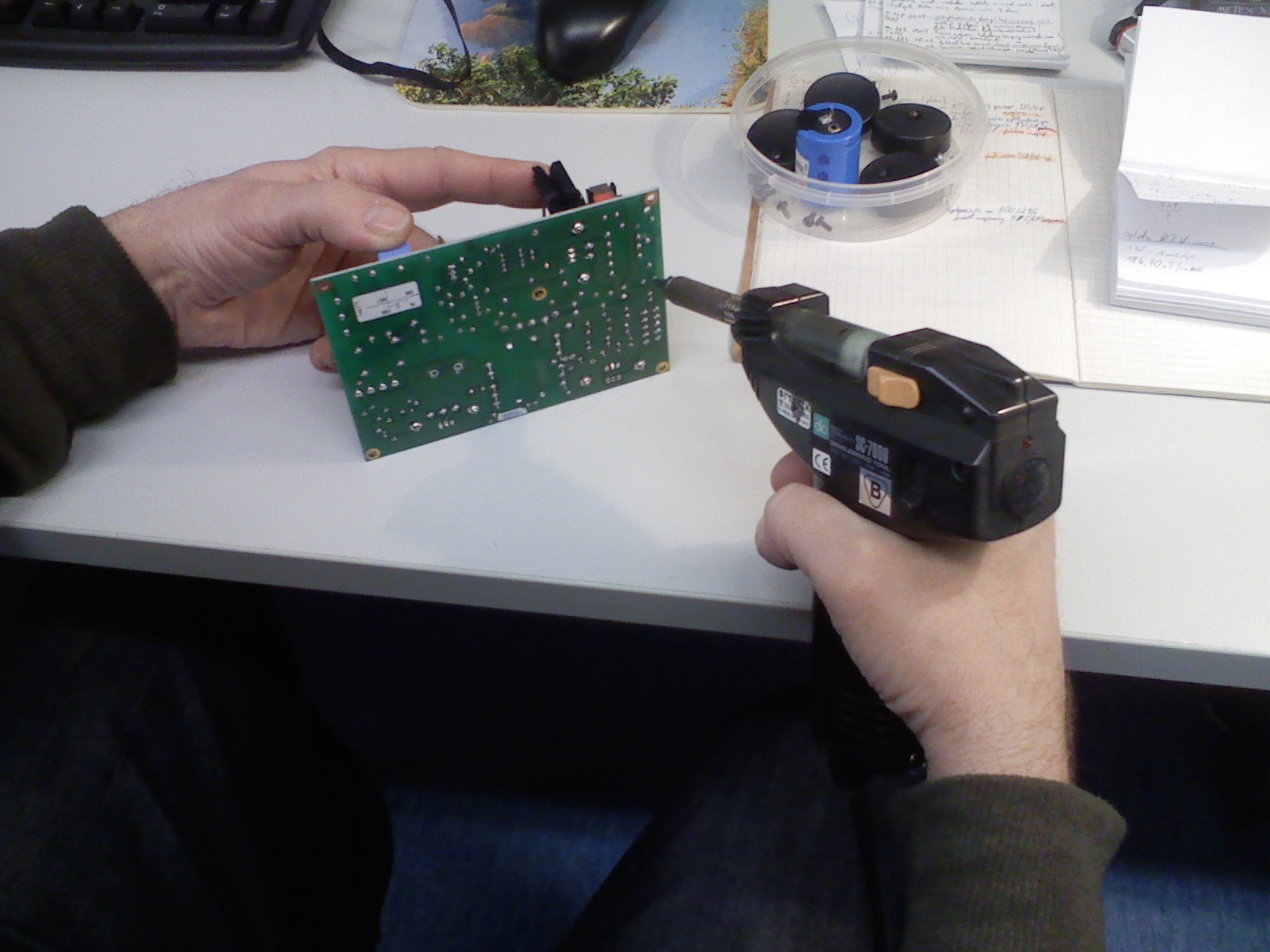
Desoldering with a desoldering gun.

Desoldering tools and materials include the following:

- Solder wick
- Heat guns, also called hot air guns
- Desoldering pump
- Removal alloys
- Removal fluxes
- Heated soldering tweezers
- Various picks and tweezers for tasks such as pulling at, holding, removing, and scraping components.
- Vacuum and pressure pumps with specialized heater tips and nozzles
- Rework stations, used to repair printed circuit board assemblies that fail factory test.

Terminology is not totally standardised. Anything with a base unit with provision to maintain a stable temperature, pump air in either direction, etc., is often called a "station" (preceded by rework, soldering, desoldering, hot air); one, or sometimes more, tools may be connected to a station, e.g., a rework station may accommodate a soldering iron and hot air head. A soldering iron with a hollow tip and a spring-, bulb-, or electrically operated suction pump may be called a desoldering iron. Terms such as "suction pen" may be used; the meaning is usually clear from the context.

=== Pumps ===
Electrically operated pumps are used for several purposes in conjunction with a hand-held head connected by a tube.

Suction pumps are used to suck away molten solder, leaving previously joined terminals disconnected. They are primarily used to release through-hole connections from a PCB. The desoldering head must be designed so that the extracted solder does not solidify so as to obstruct it, or enter the pump, and can be removed and discarded easily. It is not possible to remove a multi-pin part by melting solder on the pins sequentially, as one joint will solidify as the next is melted; pumps and solder wick are among methods to remove solder from all joints, leaving the part free to be removed.

Suction pumps are also used with a suction head appropriate for each part to pick up and remove tiny surface mount devices once solder has melted, and to place parts.

Hot air pumps blow air hot enough to melt all the solder around a small surface mounted part, and can be used for soldering parts in place, and for desoldering followed by removal before the solder solidifies by a vacuum pump or with tweezers. Hot air has a tendency to oxidise metals; a non-oxidising gas, usually nitrogen, can be used instead of air, at increased cost of equipment and consumables.

==== Desoldering pump ====
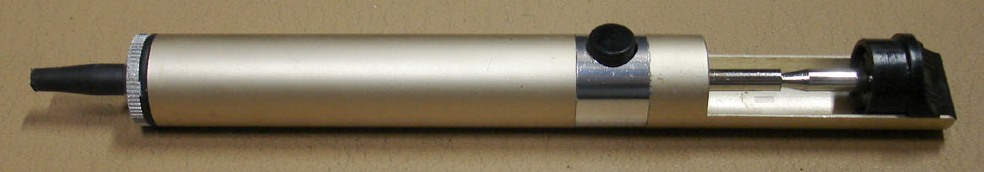
A typical spring-loaded solder sucker

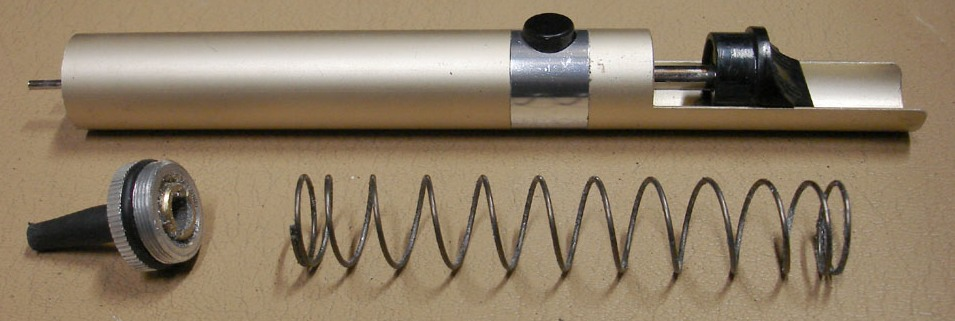
A solder sucker partially dismantled showing the spring

A desoldering pump, colloquially known as a solder sucker, is a manually operated device which is used to remove solder from a printed circuit board. There are two types: the plunger style and bulb style. (An electrically operated pump for this purpose would usually be called a vacuum pump.)

The plunger type has a cylinder with a spring-loaded piston which is pushed down and locks into place. When triggered by pressing a button, the piston springs up, creating suction that sucks the solder off the soldered connection. The bulb type creates suction by squeezing and releasing a rubber bulb.

The pump is applied to a heated solder connection, then operated to suck the solder away.

=== Desoldering braid ===
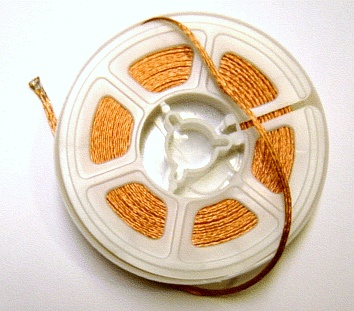
Solder wick on a reel

Desoldering braid, also known as desoldering wick or solder wick, is finely braided 18 to 42 AWG copper wire coated with rosin flux, usually supplied on a roll.

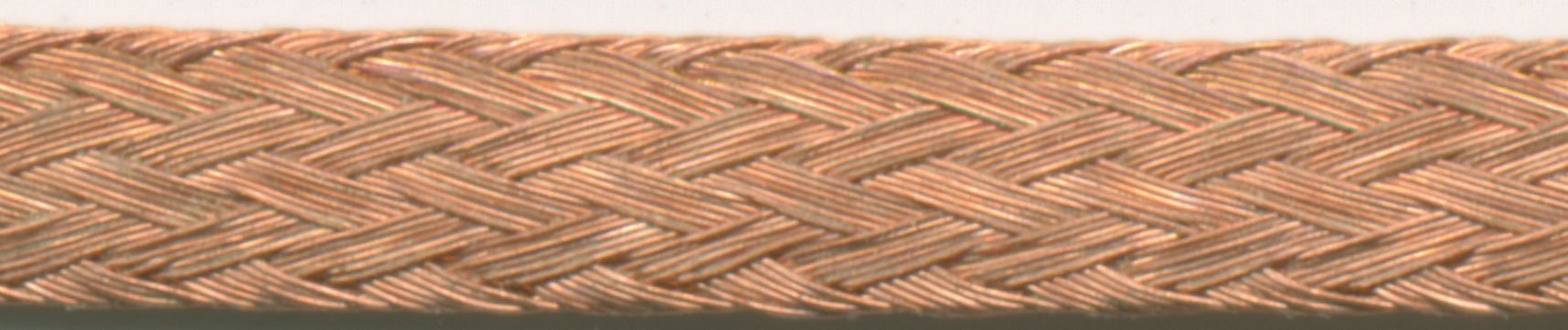
Solder wick, before use

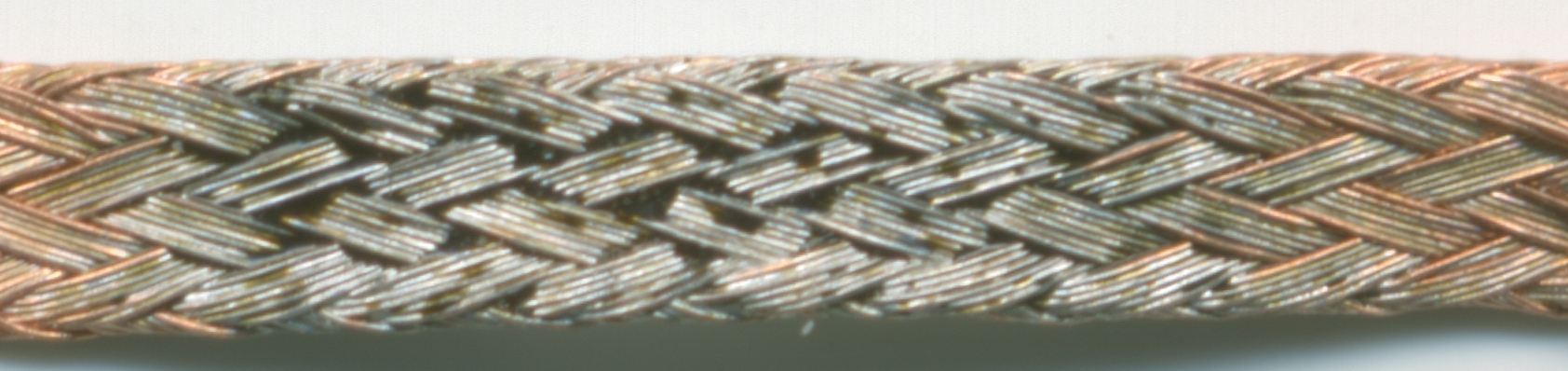
Solder wick after use, coated in solder and residue

The end of a length of braid is placed over the soldered connections of a component being removed. The connections are heated with a soldering iron until the solder melts and is wicked into the braid by capillary action. The braid is removed while the solder is still molten, its used section cut off and discarded when cool. Short lengths of cut braid will prevent heat being carried away by the braid instead of heating the joint.

== Technique ==
Desoldering requires application of heat to the solder joint and removing the molten solder so that the joint may be separated. Desoldering may be required to replace a defective component, to alter an existing circuit, or to salvage components for re-use. Use of too high a temperature or heating for too long may damage components or destroy the bond between a printed circuit trace and the board substrate. Techniques are different for through-hole and surface-mounted components.

=== Through-hole ===
A component with one or two connections to the PCB can usually be removed by heating one joint, pulling out an end of the component while the solder is molten (bending the other lead to do so), and repeating for the second joint. Solder filling the hole can be removed with a pump or with a pointed object made of a material which solder does not wet, such as stainless steel or wood.

If a multi-pin component need not be salvaged, it is often possible to cut the pins, then remove the residual ends one by one.

Components with more connections cannot be removed intact in the way described above unless the wire leads are long and flexible enough to be pulled out one by one. For a component such as a Dual-Inline Package (DIP), the pins are too short to pull out, and solder melted on one joint will solidify before another can be melted. A technique sometimes used is the use of a large soldering-iron tip designed to melt the solder on all pins at once; different tips are required for different packages. The component is removed while the solder is molten, most easily by a spring-loaded puller attached to it before heating.

Otherwise all joints must be freed from solder before the component can be removed. Each joint must be heated and the solder removed from it while molten using a vacuum pump, manual desoldering pump, or desoldering braid.

For through-hole technology on double-sided or multi-layer boards, special care must be taken not to remove the via connecting the layers, as this will ruin the entire board. Hard pulling on a lead which is not entirely free of solder (or with solder not thoroughly molten in the case of a soldering iron tip heating all pins) may pull out a via.

To remove and recover all components, both through-hole and surface-mount, from a board which itself is usually no longer needed, a flame or hot air gun can be used to rapidly heat all parts so they can be pulled off. Parts may be damaged, and toxic fumes emitted, if excessive temperature or prolonged heating is used.

=== Surface mount ===
If they do not need to be re-used, some surface-mount components can be removed by cutting their leads and desoldering the remnants with a soldering iron.

Otherwise, surface-mount components must be removed by heating the entire component to a temperature sufficient to melt the solder used, but not high or prolonged enough to damage the component. For most purposes, a temperature not exceeding 260 °C (500 °F) for a time not exceeding 10 seconds is acceptable.

The entire board may be preheated to a temperature that all components can withstand indefinitely. Then localised heat is applied to the component to remove, with less heating required than from cold. Most frequently, a hot air (or hot gas) gun, with a nozzle of appropriate size and shape, is used to heat the component, with nearby components shielded from the heat if necessary, followed by removal with tweezers or a vacuum tool. Removal of multi-pin components with a soldering iron and solder removal tools is impractical, as the solder between the component and the pads remains in place, unlike solder which can be removed from a hole.

Hot air (or gas) may be applied with tools ranging from some portable gas soldering irons such as the Weller Portasol Professional which can be fitted with a narrow hot-air nozzle, set to a temperature not controlled but approximately correct, to an industrial rework station with many facilities including hot-gas blowing, vacuum part holding, soldering iron head, and nozzles and fitting specific to particular component packages.

=== Quad flat packages ===
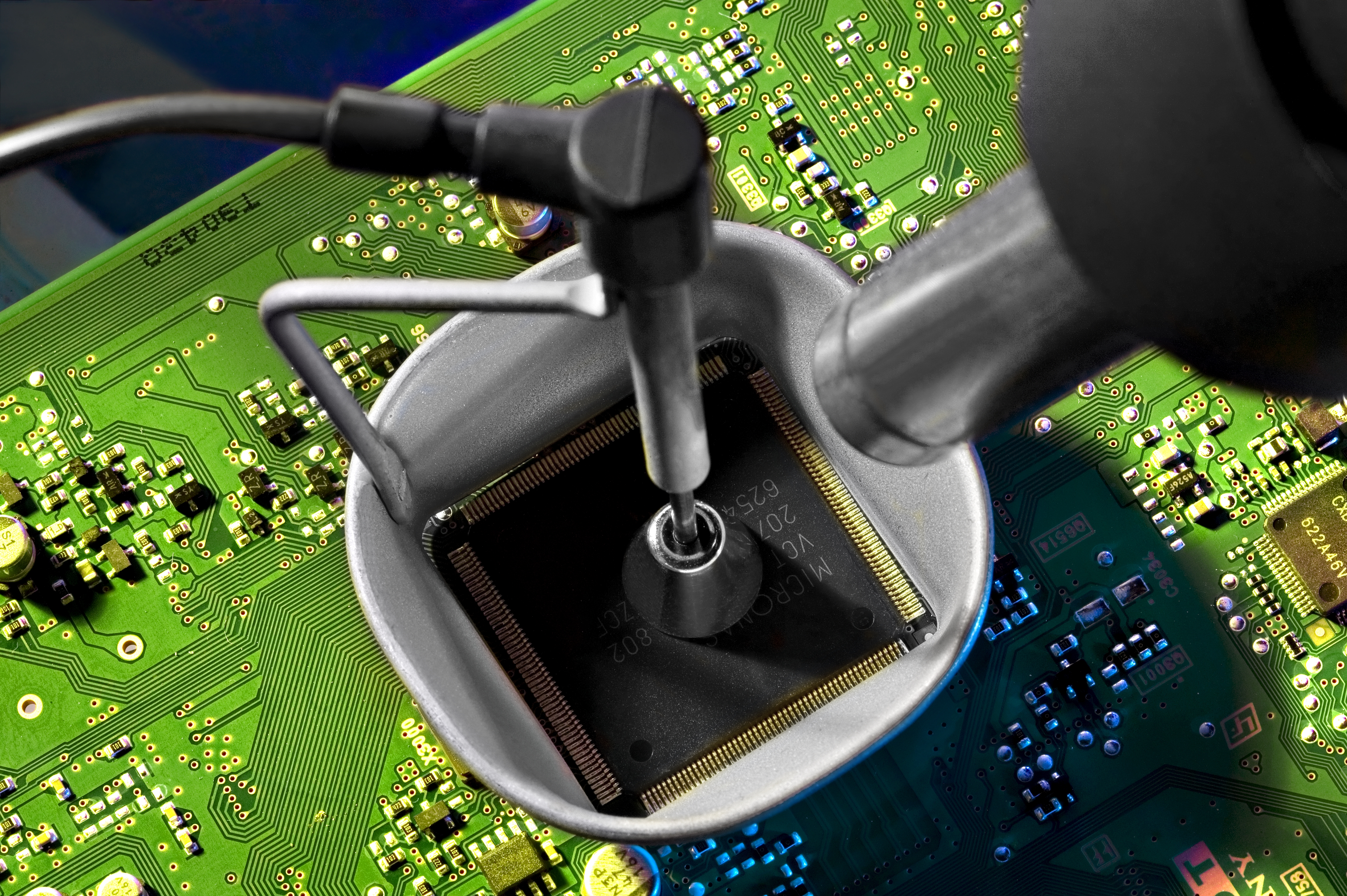
Desoldering an IC with a JBC hot air system

Quad Flat Package (QFP) chips have thin leads closely packed together protruding from the four sides of the integrated circuit (IC); usually a square IC. Removal of these chips can be problematic as it is impossible to heat all of the leads at once with a standard soldering iron. It is possible to remove them with the use of a razor blade or a high-rpm craft tool, simply by cutting off the leads. The stubs are then easy to melt off and clean with a soldering iron. Obviously this technique entails the destruction of the IC. Another method is to use a heat gun or pencil butane torch and heat up a corner, and gently pry it off, working the torch down the leads. This method often leads to traces getting lifted off the PCB where a lead did not get heated enough to cause the solder to flow.

Several vendors offer systems that use heat shields to concentrate hot air where it needs to be, protecting nearby components and avoiding damage to the board or the QFP. The extractor uses a spring system that gently pulls the IC upward when the liquid stage of solder has been reached. The IC is held by a vacuum nozzle similar to the ones used in pick & place machines. This system prevents damage to the pads on the PCB, the IC, avoids overheating surrounding components and blowing them off and also reduces the risk of operator error when using tweezers or other tools that can damage the PCB or IC.

Another way to remove these devices is to use Field's metal, an alloy which melts at around 140 °F (62 °C), lower than the boiling point of water. The metal is melted into the solder joints of the device, where it remains liquid even once cooled down to room temperature, and the chip can simply be lifted off the board. This has the advantage of not damaging the PCB or the IC, although the solder joints must be carefully cleaned of any remaining Field's metal to maintain solder joint strength after resoldering.
