= Reflow soldering =

Attachment of electronic components

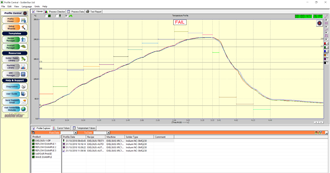
Example ramp to spike thermal profile.

Example of reflow soldering thermal profile.

Reflow soldering is a process in which a solder paste (a sticky mixture of powdered solder and flux) is used to temporarily attach anywhere from one to thousands of tiny electrical components to their contact pads, after which the entire assembly is subjected to controlled heat. The solder paste reflows in a molten state, creating permanent solder joints. Heating may be accomplished by passing the assembly through a reflow oven, under an infrared lamp, or (mainly for prototyping) by soldering individual joints with a hot air pencil.

Reflow soldering with long industrial convection ovens is the preferred method of soldering surface mount technology (SMT) components to a printed circuit board (PCB). Each segment of the oven has a regulated temperature, according to the specific thermal requirements of each assembly. Reflow ovens meant specifically for the soldering of surface mount components may also be used for through-hole components by filling the holes with solder paste and inserting the component leads through the paste. Wave soldering however, has been the common method of soldering multi-leaded through-hole components onto a circuit board designed for surface-mount components.

When used on boards containing a mix of SMT and plated through-hole (PTH) components, through-hole reflow, when achievable by specifically modified paste stencils, may allow for the wave soldering step to be eliminated from the assembly process, potentially reducing assembly costs. While this may be said of lead-tin solder pastes used previously, lead-free solder alloys such as SAC present a challenge in terms of the limits of oven temperature profile adjustment and requirements of specialized through-hole components that must be hand soldered with solder wire or cannot reasonably withstand the high temperatures directed at circuit boards as they travel on the conveyor of the reflow oven. The reflow soldering of through-hole components using solder paste in a convection oven process is called intrusive soldering.

The goal of the reflow process is for the solder paste to reach the eutectic temperature at which the particular solder alloy undergoes a phase change to a liquid or molten state. At this specific temperature range, the molten alloy demonstrates properties of adhesion. Molten solder alloy behaves much as water, with properties of cohesion and adhesion. With sufficient flux, in the state of liquidus, molten solder alloys will exhibit a characteristic called "wetting."

Wetting is a property of the alloy when within its specific eutectic temperature range. Wetting is a necessary condition for the formation of solder joints that meet the criteria as "acceptable" or "target" conditions, while "non-conforming" is considered defective according to IPC.

The reflow oven temperature profile is suited for characteristics of a particular circuit board assembly, the size and depth of the ground plane layer within the board, the number of layers within the board, the number and size of the components, for example. The temperature profile for a particular circuit board will allow for reflow of solder onto the adjoining surfaces, without overheating and damaging the electrical components beyond their temperature tolerance. In the conventional reflow soldering process, there are usually four stages, called "zones", each having a distinct thermal profile: preheat, thermal soak (often shortened to just soak), reflow, and cooling.

== Preheat zone ==
Preheat is the first stage of the reflow process. During this reflow phase, the entire board assembly climbs towards a target soak or dwell temperature. The main goal of the preheat phase is to get the entire assembly safely and consistently to a soak or pre-reflow temperature. Preheat is also an opportunity for volatile solvents in the solder paste to outgas. For paste solvents to be properly expelled and the assembly to safely reach pre-reflow temperatures the PCB must be heated in a consistent, linear manner. An important metric for the first phase of the reflow process is the temperature slope rate or rise vs time. This is often measured in degrees Celsius per second, °C/s. Many variables factor into a manufacturer's target slope rate. These include: target processing time, solder paste volatility, and component considerations. It is important to account for all these process variables, but in most cases sensitive component considerations are paramount. "Many components will crack if their temperature is changed too quickly. The maximum rate of thermal change that the most sensitive components can withstand becomes the maximum allowable slope". However, if thermally sensitive components are not in use and maximizing throughput is of great concern, aggressive slope rates may be tailored to improve processing time. For this reason, many manufacturers push these slope rates up to the maximum common allowable rate of 3.0 °C/s. Conversely, if a solder paste containing particularly strong solvents is being used, heating the assembly too fast can easily create an out of control process. As the volatile solvents outgas they may splatter solder off the pads and onto the board. Solder-balling is the main concern of violent outgassing during the preheat phase. Once a board has been ramped up to temperature in the preheat phase it is time to enter the soak or pre-reflow phase.

== Thermal soak zone ==
The second section, thermal soak, is typically a 60 to 120 second exposure for removal of solder paste volatiles and activation of the fluxes, where the flux components begin oxide reduction on component leads and pads. Too high a temperature can lead to solder spattering or balling as well as oxidation of the paste, the attachment pads and the component terminations. Similarly, fluxes may not fully activate if the temperature is too low. At the end of the soak zone a thermal equilibrium of the entire assembly is desired just before the reflow zone. A soak profile is suggested to decrease any delta T between components of varying sizes or if the PCB assembly is very large. A soak profile is also recommended to diminish voiding in area array type packages.

== Reflow zone ==
The third section, the reflow zone, is also referred to as the "time above reflow" or "temperature above liquidus" (TAL), and is the part of the process where the maximum temperature is reached. An important consideration is peak temperature, which is the maximum allowable temperature of the entire process. A common peak temperature is 20–40 °C above liquidus. This limit is determined by the component on the assembly with the lowest tolerance for high temperatures (the component most susceptible to thermal damage). A standard guideline is to subtract 5 °C from the maximum temperature that the most vulnerable component can sustain to arrive at the maximum temperature for process. It is important to monitor the process temperature to keep it from exceeding this limit. Additionally, high temperatures (beyond 260 °C) may cause damage to the internal dies of SMT components as well as foster intermetallic growth. Conversely, a temperature that is not hot enough may prevent the paste from reflowing adequately.

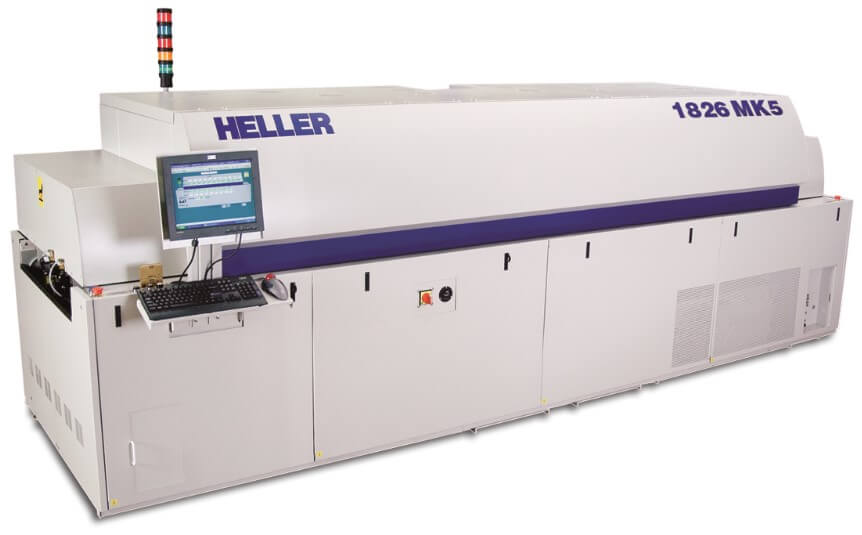
An example of a commercial reflow oven.

Time above liquidus (TAL), or time above reflow, measures how long the solder is a liquid. The flux reduces surface tension at the juncture of the metals to accomplish metallurgical bonding, allowing the individual solder powder spheres to combine. If the profile time exceeds the manufacturer's specification, the result may be premature flux activation or consumption, effectively "drying" the paste before formation of the solder joint. An insufficient time/temperature relationship causes a decrease in the flux's cleaning action, resulting in poor wetting, inadequate removal of the solvent and flux, and possibly defective solder joints. Experts usually recommend the shortest TAL possible, however, most pastes specify a minimum TAL of 30 seconds, although there appears to be no clear reason for that specific time. One possibility is that there are places on the PCB that are not measured during profiling, and therefore, setting the minimum allowable time to 30 seconds reduces the chances of an unmeasured area not reflowing. A high minimum reflow time also provides a margin of safety against oven temperature changes. The wetting time ideally stays below 60 seconds above liquidus. Additional time above liquidus may cause excessive intermetallic growth, which can lead to joint brittleness. The board and components may also be damaged at extended temperature over liquidus, and most components have a well-defined time limit for how long they may be exposed to temperatures over a given maximum. Too little time above liquidus may trap solvents and flux and create the potential for cold or dull joints as well as solder voids.

== Cooling zone ==
The last zone is a cooling zone to gradually cool the processed board and solidify the solder joints. Proper cooling inhibits excess intermetallic formation or thermal shock to the components. Typical temperatures in the cooling zone range from 30–110 °C (86–230 °F). A fast cooling rate is chosen to create a fine grain structure that is most mechanically sound. Unlike the maximum ramp-up rate, the ramp–down rate is often ignored. The ramp rate is less critical above certain temperatures, however, the maximum allowable slope for any component should apply whether the component is heating up or cooling down. A cooling rate of 4 °C/s is commonly suggested. It is a parameter to consider when analyzing process results.

== Etymology ==
The term "reflow" is used to refer to the temperature above which a solid mass of solder alloy is certain to melt (as opposed to merely soften). If cooled below this temperature, the solder will not flow. Warmed above it once more, the solder will flow again—hence "re-flow".

Modern circuit assembly techniques that use reflow soldering do not necessarily allow the solder to flow more than once. They guarantee that the granulated solder contained in the solder paste surpasses the reflow temperature of the solder involved.

== Thermal profiling ==
Thermal profiling is the act of measuring several points on a circuit board to determine the thermal excursion it takes through the soldering process. In the electronics manufacturing industry, SPC (statistical process control) helps determine if the process is in control, measured against the reflow parameters defined by the soldering technologies and component requirements. Modern software tools allow a profile to be captured, then automatically optimized using a mathematical simulation, which greatly reduces the time needed to establish optimal settings for the process.

== See also ==
- Reflow oven
- Restriction of Hazardous Substances Directive (RoHS)
- Rework (electronics)
- Thermal profiling
- Wave soldering
