= Ajit Manocha =

Indian-American engineer and business executive

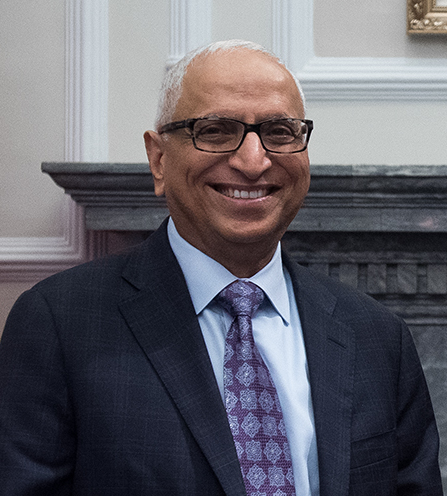
- Education: Hansraj College; Delhi University; Kansas State University
- Occupations: SEMI President and CEO, Director of POET Technologies
- Years active: 40
- Employer: SEMI
- Known for: Industry pioneer, leader, venture accelerator, and former CEO of GLOBALFOUNDRIES

Ajit Manocha is an Indian-American engineer who is serving as the president and CEO of SEMI which is the global industry association serving the electronics manufacturing and design supply chain. Manocha has over 40 years of global experience in the semiconductor industry.

Manocha was formerly CEO at GlobalFoundries, and while there he also served as vice chairman and chairman of the Semiconductor Industry Association (SIA). Earlier, Manocha served as EVP of worldwide operations at Spansion. Prior to Spansion, Manocha was EVP and chief manufacturing officer at Philips/NXP Semiconductors. He began his career at AT&T Bell Laboratories as a research scientist where he was granted several patents related to microelectronics manufacturing.

Manocha has served on the President's committees for “Advanced Manufacturing Partnerships” and the President's Council of Advisors on Science & Technology (PCAST). In 2020, the Silicon Valley Engineering Council (SVEC) inducted Manocha to be in the Silicon Valley Engineering Hall of Fame for championing industry collaboration, driving manufacturing efficiency and pioneering reactive ion etching, as well as for manufacturing process flows for logic and memory chips that serve as the foundation for modern electronics.
