= Book-to-bill ratio =

Ratio of orders received to billed over a given period

SME book-to-bill ratios (2006–2012, SEMI and SEAJ)

The book-to-bill ratio, also known as the BB ratio or BO/BI ratio, is the ratio of orders received to the amount billed for a specific period, usually one month or one quarter. It is widely used in the technology sector and especially in the semiconductor industry, where the semiconductor manufacturing equipment (SME) book-to-bill ratio is considered an important leading indicator of demand trends.

A book-to-bill ratio above one means that more orders were received than filled, indicating strong demand, while a ratio below one indicates weak demand.

== Reports ==
=== SEMI ===
Semiconductor Equipment and Materials International (SEMI) publishes a monthly book-to-bill report for SME manufacturers headquartered in North America. The report is based on confidential bookings and billings data for 22 different equipment categories, broken down into seven regions: "North America", "Japan", "Europe", "Taiwan", "Korea", "China", and "Rest of World".

=== SEAJ ===
The Semiconductor Equipment Association of Japan (SEAJ) publishes monthly book-to-bill reports for SME, LCD, and related equipment manufacturers headquartered in Japan. Like the SEMI reports, the SEAJ reports are based on three-month moving averages. Detailed reports are available to SEAJ members and manufacturers who participate in the SEAJ data collection program.

As of 2005, Japanese and North American SME manufacturers each accounted for more than 40% of the world market.

=== IPC ===
IPC, the trade association of the electronics interconnect and packaging industry, distributes monthly market reports for the electronics manufacturing services (EMS) and printed circuit board (PCB) segments. The reports provide recent data on market size and near-term forecasts, and include book-to-bill data. They are available free to participating manufacturers and by subscription.
