= Wave soldering =

Electronics soldering process

Inside a wave soldering machine, showing the wave soldering process

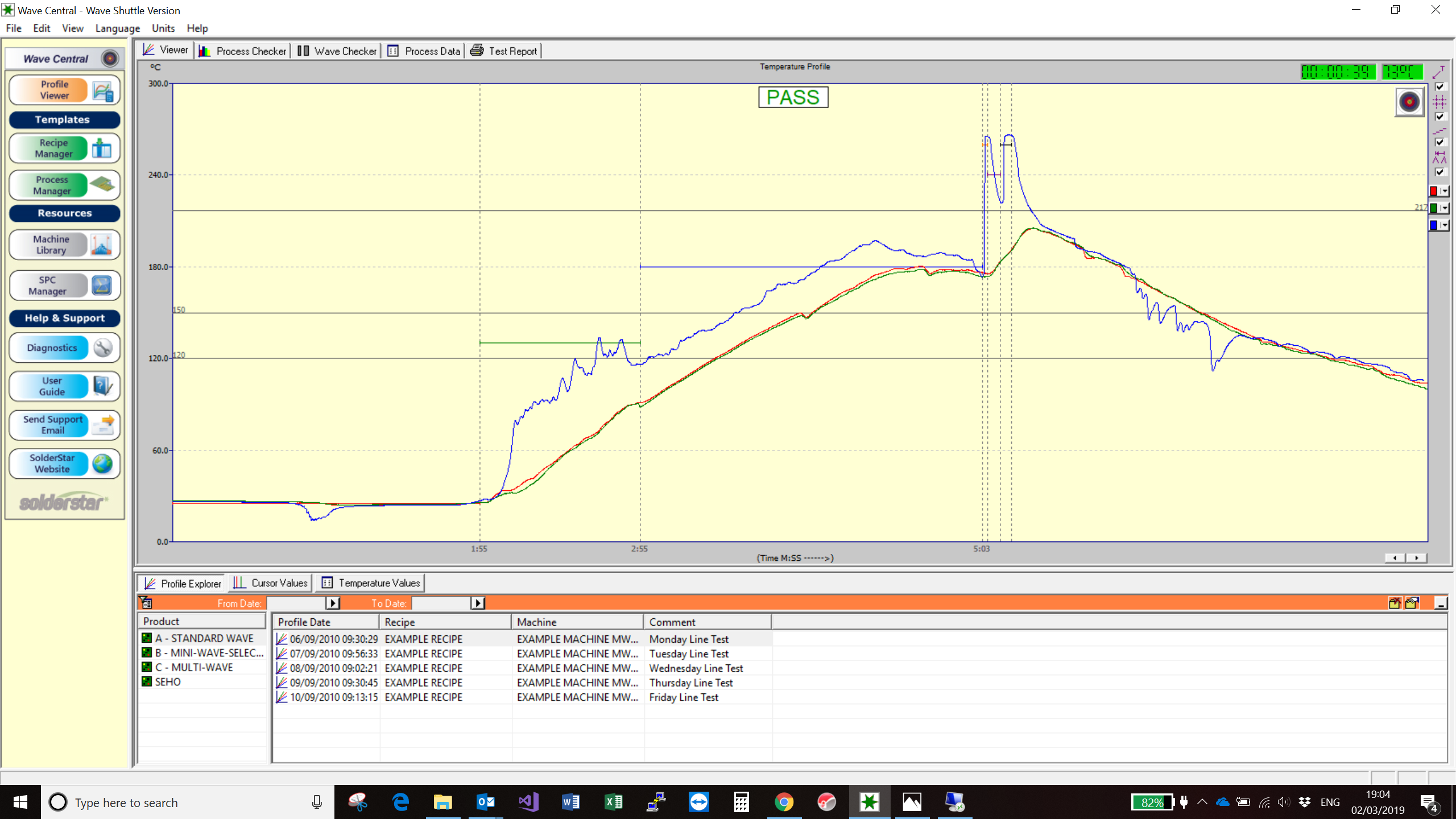
Temperature and time graph showing wave soldering solder pot and topside temperatures

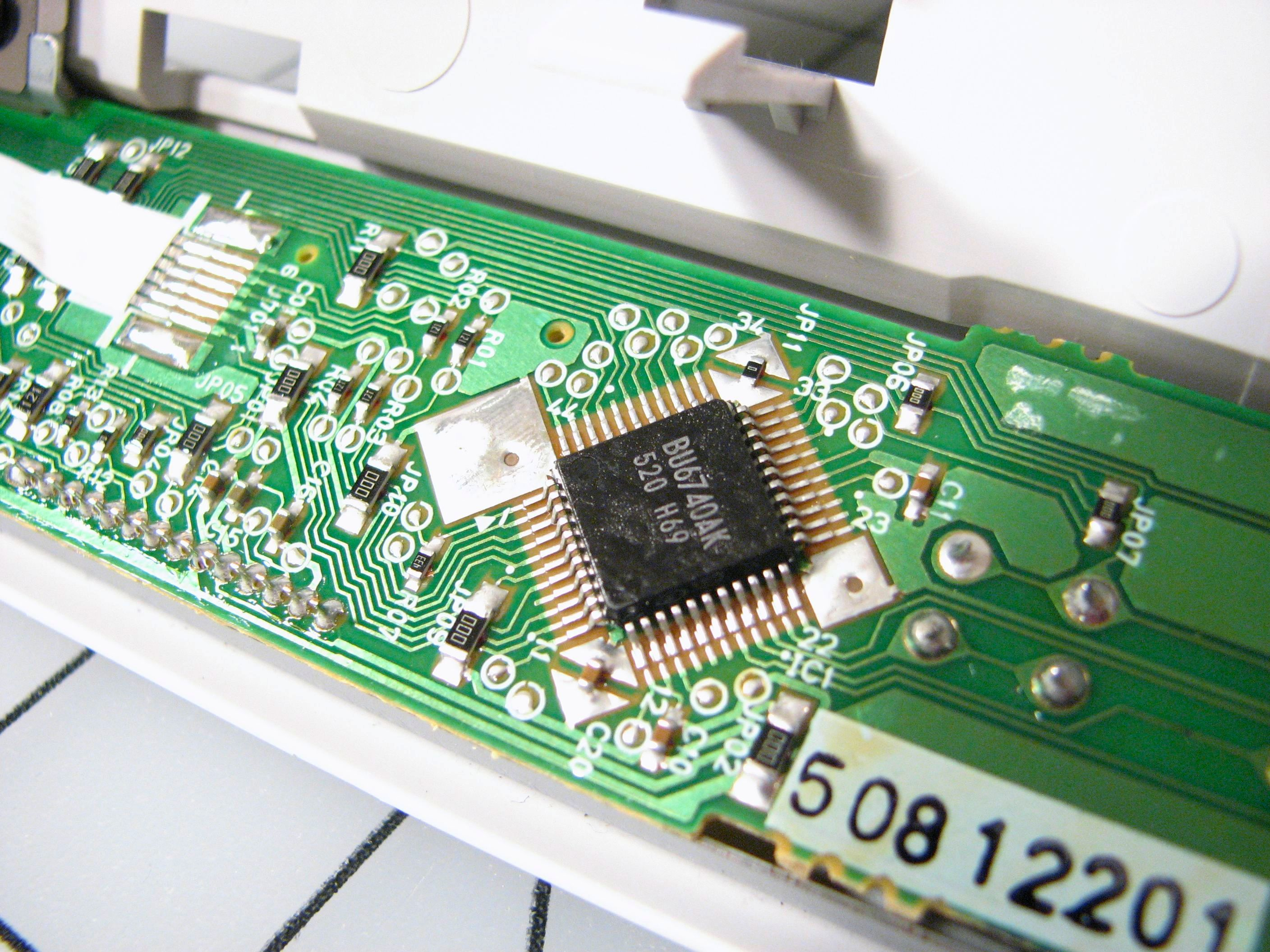
A typical Wave soldered PCB assembly

Wave soldering is a bulk soldering process used in printed circuit board manufacturing. The circuit board is passed over a pan of molten solder in which a pump produces an upwelling of solder that looks like a standing wave. As the circuit board makes contact with this wave, the components become soldered to the board. Wave soldering is used for both through-hole printed circuit assemblies, and surface mount. In the latter case, the components are glued onto the surface of a printed circuit board (PCB) by placement equipment, before being run through the molten solder wave. Wave soldering is mainly used in soldering of through hole components.

As through-hole components have been largely replaced by surface mount components, wave soldering has been supplanted by reflow soldering methods in many large-scale electronics applications. However, there is still significant wave soldering where surface-mount technology (SMT) is not suitable (e.g., large power devices and high pin count connectors), or where simple through-hole technology prevails (certain major appliances).

== Wave solder process ==
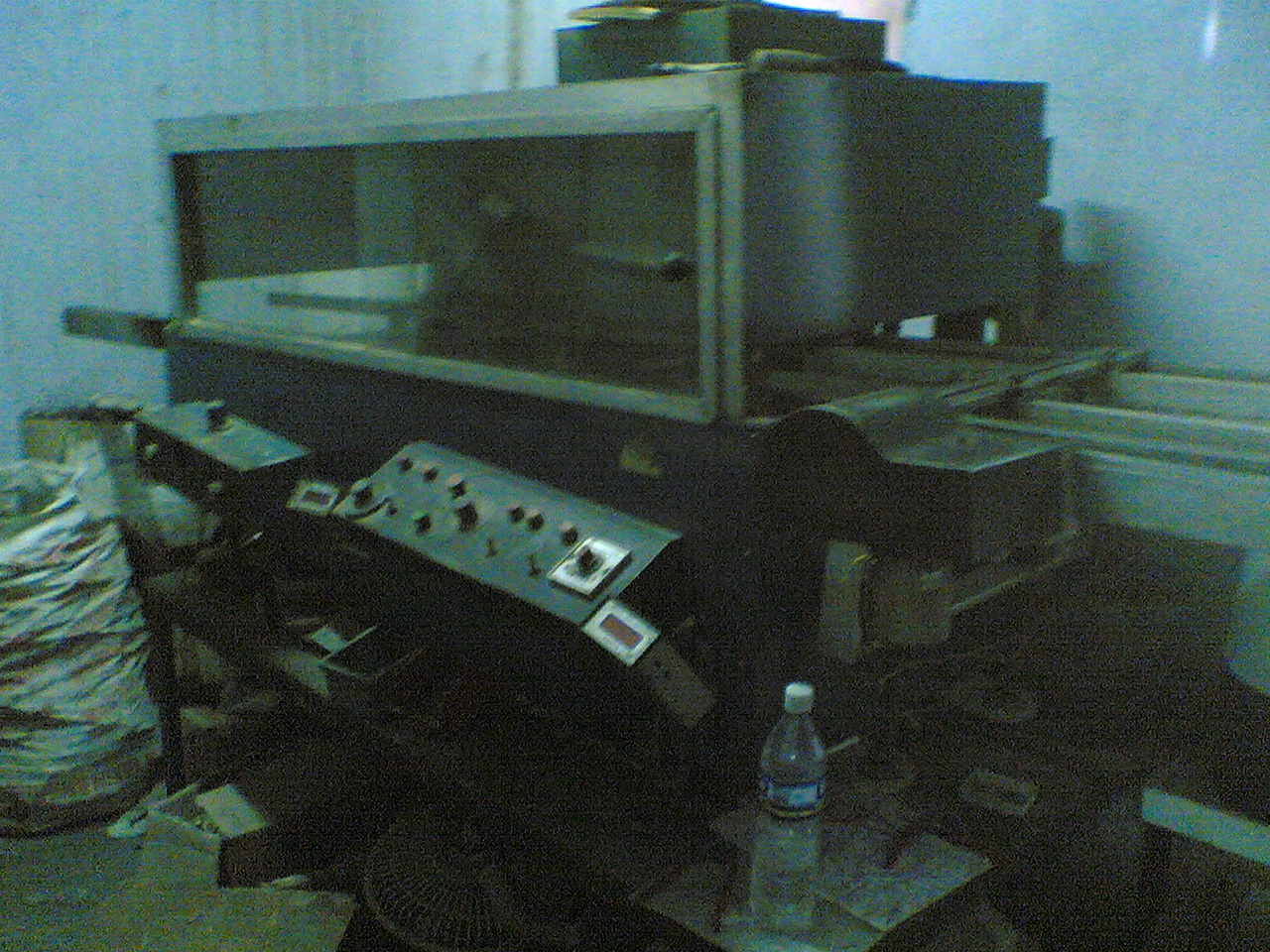
A simple wave soldering machine.

There are many types of wave solder machines; however, the basic components and principles of these machines are the same. The basic equipment used during the process is a conveyor that moves the PCB through the different zones, a pan of solder used in the soldering process, a pump that produces the actual wave, the sprayer for the flux and the preheating pad. The solder is usually a mixture of metals. A typical leaded solder is composed of 50% tin, 49.5% lead, and 0.5% antimony. The Restriction of Hazardous Substances Directive (RoHS) has led to an ongoing transition away from 'traditional' leaded solder in modern manufacturing in favor of lead-free alternatives. Both tin-silver-copper and tin-copper-nickel alloys are commonly used, with one common alloy called SN100C, developed by Nihon Superior Co, being 99.25% tin, 0.7% copper, 0.05% nickel and <0.01% germanium.

== Fluxing ==
Flux in the wave soldering process has a primary and a secondary objective. The primary objective is to clean the components that are to be soldered, principally any oxide layers that may have formed. There are two types of flux, corrosive and noncorrosive. Noncorrosive flux requires precleaning and is used when low acidity is required. Corrosive flux is quick and requires little precleaning but has a higher acidity.

== Preheating ==
Preheating helps to accelerate the soldering process and to prevent thermal shock.

== Cleaning ==
Some types of flux, called "no-clean" fluxes, do not require cleaning; their residues are benign after the soldering process. Typically no-clean fluxes are especially sensitive to process conditions, which may make them undesirable in some applications. Other kinds of flux, however, require a cleaning stage, in which the PCB is washed with solvents and/or deionized water to remove flux residue.

== Finish and quality ==
Quality depends on proper temperatures when heating and on properly treated surfaces.

Defect	Possible causes	Effects
Cracks	Mechanical Stress	Loss of conductivity
Cavities	Contaminated surface Lack of flux Insufficient preheating	Reduction in strength Poor conductivity
Wrong solder thickness	Wrong solder temperature Wrong conveyor speed	Susceptible to stress Too thin for current load Undesired bridging between paths
Poor conductor	Contaminated solder	Product failures

== Solder types ==
Different combinations of tin, lead, and other metals are used to create solder. The combinations used depend on the desired properties. The most popular combinations are SAC (tin/silver/copper) alloys for lead-free processes and Sn63Pb37, which is a eutectic alloy consisting of 63% tin and 37% lead. This latter combination melts sharply at 183 °C with no 'plastic' range between solid and molten states (unlike the older 60/40 tin/lead alloy). Higher tin compositions provide greater corrosion resistance but raise the melting point.

Environmental and performance requirements also factor into alloy selection. Common restrictions include limits on lead (Pb) under RoHS compliance requirements and restrictions on pure tin (Sn) when long-term reliability is a concern due to whisker growth.

== Effects of cooling rate ==
It is important that the PCBs be allowed to cool at a reasonable rate. If they are cooled too fast, then the PCB can become warped, and the solder can be compromised. On the other hand, if the PCB is allowed to cool too slowly, then the PCB can become brittle, and some components may be damaged by heat. The PCB should be cooled by either a fine water spray or air cooled to decrease the amount of damage to the board.

== Thermal profiling ==
Thermal profiling is the act of measuring several points on a circuit board to determine the thermal excursion it takes through the soldering process. In the electronics manufacturing industry, SPC (statistical process control) helps determine if the process is in control, measured against the reflow parameters defined by the soldering technologies and component requirements. Products like the Solderstar WaveShuttle and the Optiminer have been developed special fixtures which are passed through the process and can measure the temperature profile, along with contact times, wave parallelism and wave heights. These fixtures combined with analysis software allows the production engineer to establish and then control the wave solder process.

== Solder wave height ==
The height of the solder wave is a key parameter that needs to be evaluated when setting up the wave solder process. The contact time between the solder wave and assembly being soldered is typically set to between 2 and 4 seconds. This contact time is controlled by two parameters on the machine, conveyor speed and wave height, changes to either of these parameters will result in a change in contact time. The wave height is typically controlled by increasing or decreasing the pump speed on the machine. Changes can be evaluated and checked using a tempered glass plate, if more detailed recordings are required. Then fixtures are available which digitally record the contact times, height and speed. Also, some wave solder machines can give the operator a choice between a smooth laminar wave or a slightly higher-pressure 'dancer' wave.

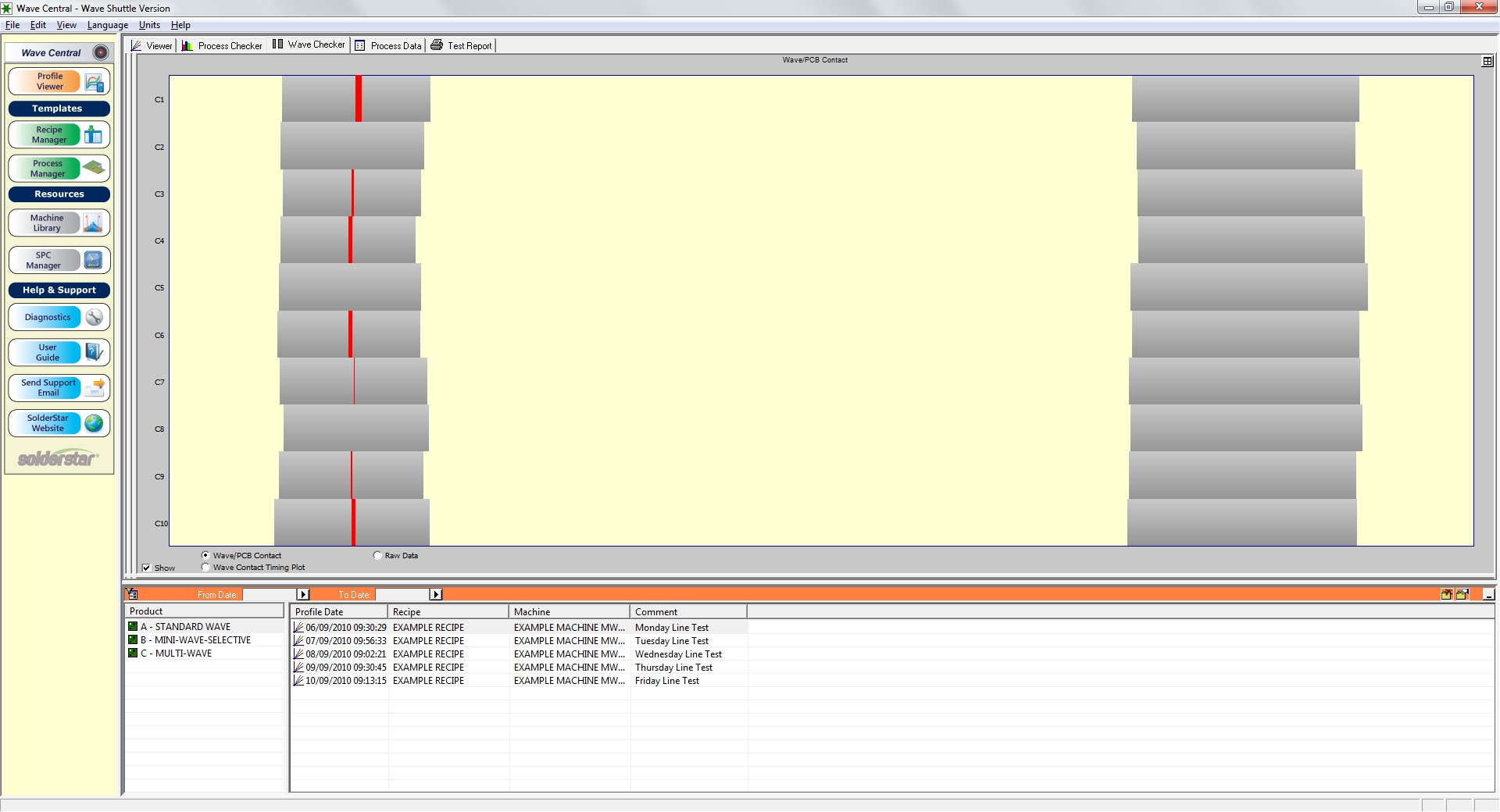
Contact times and shape of wave solder on underside of PCB

== See also ==
- Dip soldering
- Thermal profiling
- Solder mask
