= SEMI =

Electronics industry association

- Formation: 1970
- Founder: Bill Hugle, Fred Kulicke, John Dannelly
- Type: Trade association
- Headquarters: Milpitas, California United States
- Region served: International
- Board of Directors Chair: Mary Puma
- President and CEO: Ajit Manocha
- Website: www.semi.org

SEMI is an industry association comprising companies involved in the electronics design and manufacturing supply chain. They provide equipment, materials and services for the manufacture of semiconductors, photovoltaic panels, LED and flat panel displays, micro-electromechanical systems (MEMS), printed and flexible electronics, and related micro and nano-technologies.

SEMI is headquartered in Milpitas, California, and has offices in Bangalore; Berlin; Brussels; Hsinchu; Seoul; Shanghai; Singapore; Tokyo; and Washington, D.C. Its main activities include conferences and trade shows, development of industry standards, market research reporting, and industry advocacy. The president and chief executive officer of the organization is Ajit Manocha. The previous CEO was Dennis P. McGuirk, and before him, Stanley T. Myers.

== Global advocacy ==
SEMI Global Advocacy represents the interests of the semiconductor industry's design, manufacturing and supply chain businesses worldwide. SEMI promotes its positions on public issues via press releases, position papers, presentations, social media, web content, and media interviews.

SEMI Global Advocacy focuses on five priorities: taxes, trade, technology, talent, and environment, health and safety (EHS).

== Workforce development ==
SEMI Workforce Development attracts, and develops talent that can fulfill the requirements of the electronics industry. SEMI programs include:

- SEMI Works. Begun in 2019, SEMI Works develops a standardized process that identifies technical competencies and certifies relevant college coursework. The program is designed to improve the job hiring process for both applicants and employers.
- Diversity and Inclusion Council. This council communicates best practices and benefits arising from diverse and inclusive cultures, using white papers, services, webinars, workshops, presentations and events.

== SEMI standards ==
The SEMI Standards program was established in 1973 using proceeds from the west coast SEMICON show. Its first initiative, following meetings with silicon suppliers, was a successful effort to set common wafer diameters to be used in silicon manufacturing. This standardization helped the industry avoid a wafer shortage from 1973 to 1974, that had previously been anticipated. The standards would become internationally utilized over the years, through partnerships with the ASTM, the DIN, and other national standards organizations. Before these standards, there were more than two thousand different specifications for silicon and by 1975 80% of all silicon wafers met with the SEMI standard. It was first published annually as the Book of SEMI Standards. With three new standards published annually in the mid-2000s, the book was eventually replaced with a CD-ROM, and now standards are available online on an annual subscription basis.

Today, more than 1,000 SEMI standards and safety guidelines are available to address all aspects of automated fabs. The standards are developed and maintained by over 5,000 volunteer experts representing more than 2,000 companies, working in 23 technical committees and 200 task forces. High-profile standards include wafer dimensions and materials, factory efficiency and reliability, equipment interfaces, and environmental, health and safety standards. In 2022, SEMI published first ever a pair of Cybersecurity Standards, to help protect against future cyberattacks on factory equipment. SEMI E187 - Specification for Cybersecurity of Fab Equipment, and SEMI E188 - Specification for Malware Free Equipment Integration.

The four main equipment communication standards are the SECS-I (which stands for SEMI Equipment Communication Standards) established in 1978 that deals with communication protocol and physical definitions, the SECS-II established in 1982 that deals with message format, the GEM established in 1992 that refines the SECS-II, and the HSMS that supersedes SECS-I established in 1994. The organization also provides safety and ergonomics guidelines, the first of which was the SEMI S2 developed in 1993, followed by the SEMI S8 in 1995.

== Conferences and trade shows ==
SEMI was founded in 1970 as an association of semiconductor production equipment vendors. At that time, most companies in the semiconductor industry exhibited at the Wescon Show on the west coast and the IEEE show on the east coast. Wishing to organize a show dedicated to semiconductor production equipment, 55 companies met in Palo Alto and agreed to found a new association, originally called Semiconductor Equipment and Materials Institute.

The first SEMICON show was held in 1971 at the San Mateo Fairground in California, which featured “semiconductor processing equipment, materials, and service firms.” It featured 80 exhibitors and attracted 2,800 visitors. In 1973, the first SEMICON East show was held in New York City, with 120 exhibitors participating. This was followed by SEMICON Europa in Zürich, Switzerland (1975) and SEMICON Japan in Tokyo (1977), which attracted more than 200 exhibitors and 4,500 visitors. Through this and other activities, the organization grew from a domestic organization to one with an international focus. Part of this focus was to work with governments to reduce trade barriers and develop “a sympathetic regulatory climate” for its member organizations—companies that sold equipment and materials to firms that produce microprocessors.

Today SEMI organizes and produces nearly 100 technology showcases, trade shows, conferences and special events per year in all of the major manufacturing regions of the world. They include trade shows in China, Japan, Germany, Singapore, South Korea, Taiwan, North America, and Europe, as well as executive conferences, technical programs, and standards meetings. The organization also has technical education programs, and a weekly email newsletter. Presentations delivered at its symposia are available to members of the organization on the Members Only section of the website.

== Market research reports ==
SEMI provides market research reports for the semiconductor equipment, materials, and LED industries. Its billing data is considered an important leading indicator of demand trends and is closely watched within the industry and by semiconductor market analysts and investor. It also releases the World Fab Forecast.

The semiconductor equipment billings report provides a three-month rolling average of the book-to-bill ratio for semiconductor equipment manufacturers with headquarters in North America. It is released approximately three weeks after the close of each month.

Data for the reports is collected directly from suppliers through a confidential data collection program via an independent financial services company.

There are data collection programs in the following areas.

- Equipment market
- Packaging market
- Materials market
- Semiconductor Fabrication foundries and capacity

In-depth reports are broken down by region, supply chain segment, and equipment type.

== Smart initiatives ==
SEMI Smart Initiatives build activities around promising electronics markets emerging from mass digitalization in the Fourth Industrial Era. The initiatives synchronize advances around semiconductors, electronics and imaging systems, the Internet of Things, MEMS, sensors, devices, displays, and other digital technologies used in the electronics industry.

SEMI Smart Initiatives include:

- Smart Mobility. This initiative is focused primarily on the automotive and autonomous vehicle supply chain. In 2018, SEMI formed the Global Automotive Advisory Council, composed of five regional chapters (Europe, United States, Japan, Taiwan, China), which engages stakeholders to address common challenges, priorities, solutions, and opportunities. GAAC members include Audi, BMW, Ford, and Volkswagen.
- Smart MedTech. For example, SEMI's Nano-Bio Materials Consortium (NVMC) brings critical information and project funding to the electronics industry; the SEMI-FlexTech partnership focuses on the rise of flexible, printed and hybrid electronics to better fit the contours and movement of the human form, in part for healthcare applications.
- Smart Manufacturing. This initiative focuses on challenges and opportunities integrating production and sensor data, analytics, artificial intelligence, automated systems and more with traditional manufacturing technologies. Regional chapters worldwide collaborate through conferences, communities, working groups and online meetings.
- Smart Data. This initiative aims to improve efficiency in the semiconductor design and manufacturing supply chain through new data analytics, artificial intelligence (AI) and machine learning (ML). In addition to efficiency improvements, activities aim to reduce costs, validate semiconductor chips and products, speed process development and to problem-solve root causes.

== Technology communities ==
More than 20 SEMI Technology Communities, 150 Committees, and 15 Partner organizations provide access to global networks for collaboration, professional growth, business opportunities, educational events, workshops, and industrywide intelligence. In June 2021, SEMI established its first Semiconductor Committee focusing on Cybersecurity, seeking to raise the overall supply chain security, and building supply resilience through cybersecurity.

== Strategic Association Partnerships ==
In 2019, Electronic Systems Design Alliance (ESDA) joined SEMI as a SEMI Strategic Association partner In 2018, Electronic System Design Alliance joined SEMI as a Strategic Association partner.

In 2019, Nano Bio Materials Consortium (NBMC) joined SEMI as a SEMI Strategic Association partner

In 2018, Fab Owners Association joined SEMI as a SEMI Strategic Association partner.

In 2017, MSIG (MEMS & Sensors Industry Group) joined SEMI as a SEMI Strategic Association partner bringing MEMS and Sensors community to SEMI's global platforms.

In 2016, FlexTech joined SEMI as a SEMI Strategic Association partner.

== See also ==
- Semiconductor device fabrication
- Semiconductor Industry Association
