= IPC (electronics) =

Trade association for electronics

- Formation: 1957; 69 years ago
- Type: Industry association
- Headquarters: Bannockburn, Illinois, United States
- Chairman: Robert Neves
- President and CEO: John W. Mitchell
- Website: www.ipc.org
- Formerly called: Institute of Printed Circuits, Institute for Interconnecting and Packaging Electronic Circuits

IPC is a global trade association that standardizes the assembly and production requirements of electronic equipment and assemblies. IPC is headquartered in Bannockburn, Illinois, with additional offices in the United States, China, Japan, Thailand, India, Germany, and Belgium.

IPC is accredited by the American National Standards Institute (ANSI) as a standards developing organization. It publishes acceptability standards for the electronics industry.

== History ==
It was founded in 1957 as the Institute of Printed Circuits. Its name was later changed to the Institute for Interconnecting and Packaging Electronic Circuits to reflect the industry's expansion from bare boards to packaging and electronic assemblies. In 1999, the organization formally changed its name to IPC.

== Standards ==
IPC standards are used by the electronics manufacturing industry. IPC-A-610, Acceptability of Electronic Assemblies, is used by original equipment manufacturers and EMS companies. Standards are created by committees of industry volunteers, with task groups in China, the United States, and Denmark.

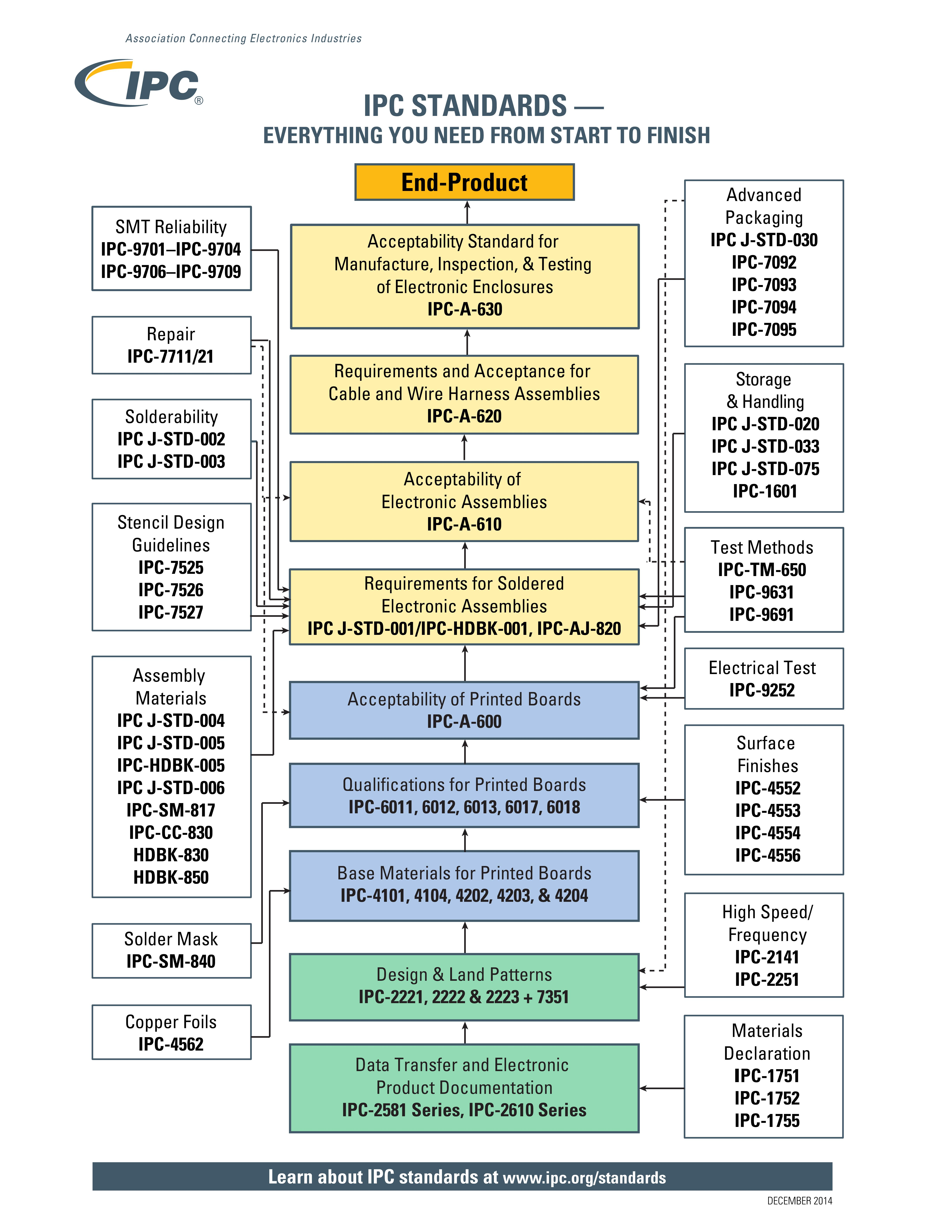
IPC Standard Tree

Standards published by IPC include:

General documents

- IPC-T-50 Terms and Definitions
- IPC-2615 Printed Board Dimensions and Tolerances
- IPC-D-325 Documentation Requirements for Printed Boards
- IPC-A-31 Flexible Raw Material Test Pattern
- IPC-ET-652 Guidelines and Requirements for Electrical Testing of Unpopulated Printed Boards

Design specifications

- IPC-2612 Sectional Requirements for Electronic Diagramming Documentation (Schematic and Logic Descriptions)
- IPC-2141A Design Guide for High-Speed Controlled Impedance Circuit Boards
- IPC-2221 Generic Standard on Printed Board Design
- IPC-2223 Sectional Design Standard for Flexible Printed Boards
- IPC-2251 Design Guide for the Packaging of High Speed Electronic Circuit
- IPC-7351B Generic Requirements for Surface Mount Design and Land Pattern Standards

Material specifications

- IPC-FC-234 Pressure Sensitive Adhesives Assembly Guidelines for Single-Sided and Double-Sided Flexible Printed Circuits
- IPC-4562 Metal Foil for Printed Wiring Applications
- IPC-4101 Laminate Prepreg Materials Standard for Printed Boards
- IPC-4202 Flexible Base Dielectrics for Use in Flexible Printed Circuitry
- IPC-4203 Adhesive Coated Dielectric Films for Use as Cover Sheets for Flexible Printed Circuitry and Flexible Adhesive Bonding Films
- IPC-4204 Flexible Metal-Clad Dielectrics for Use in Fabrication of Flexible Printed Circuitry

Performance and inspection documents

- IPC-A-600 Acceptability of Printed Boards
- IPC-A-610 Acceptability of Electronic Assemblies
- IPC/WHMA-A-620 Requirements and Acceptance for Cable and Wire Harness Assemblies
- IPC-6011 Generic Performance Specification for Printed Boards
- IPC-6012 Qualification and Performance Specification for Rigid Printed Boards
- IPC-6013 Specification for Printed Wiring, Flexible and Rigid-Flex
- IPC-6018 Qualification and Performance Specification for High Frequency (Microwave) Printed Boards
- IPC- 6202 IPC/JPCA Performance Guide Manual for Single- and Double-Sided Flexible Printed Wiring Boards
- PAS-62123 Performance Guide Manual for Single & Double Sided Flexible Printed Wiring Boards
- IPC-TF-870 Qualification and Performance of Polymer Thick Film Printed Boards

Flex assembly and materials standards

- IPC-FA-251 Assembly Guidelines for Single and Double Sided Flexible Printed Circuits
- IPC-3406 Guidelines for Electrically Conductive Surface Mount Adhesives
- IPC-3408 General Requirements for Anisotropically Conductive Adhesives Films

== Market research ==
IPC publishes market research and statistical reports for the electronics manufacturing services (EMS), printed circuit board (PCB), laminate, process consumables, solder, and assembly equipment segments.

These include annual and monthly reports covering metrics such as market size, sales growth, book-to-bill ratios, and production forecasts in the Americas and worldwide.

== Classes ==
The IPC has established three classes of workmanship standards for assemblies: IPC Class 1, IPC Class 2, and IPC Class 3.

Class 1 and Class 2 generally focus on consumer products, while Class 3 is designated for industrial use.
