= Reflow oven =

Machine used in circuit board production

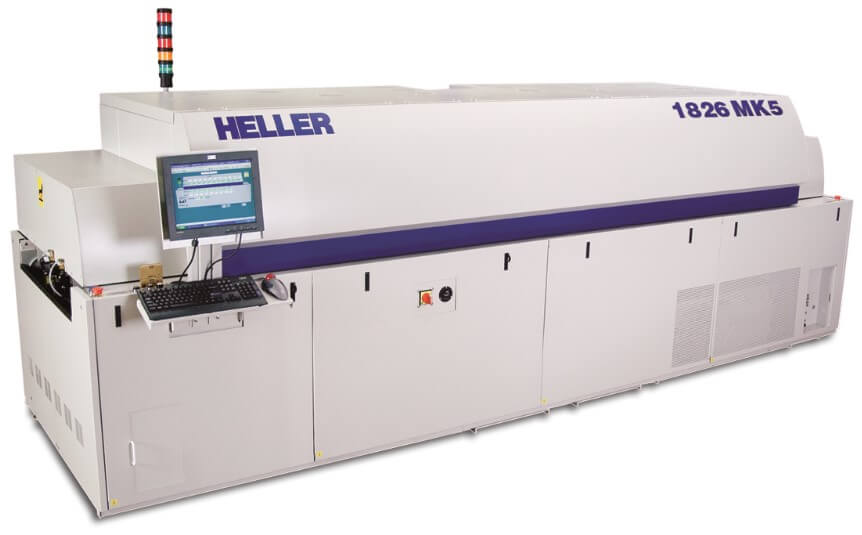
A convection reflow oven.

A reflow oven is a machine used primarily for reflow soldering of surface mount electronic components to printed circuit boards (PCBs).

In commercial high-volume use, reflow ovens take the form of a long tunnel containing a conveyor belt along which PCBs travel. For prototyping or hobbyist use PCBs can be placed in a small oven with a door.

Example of reflow soldering thermal profile.

Commercial conveyorised reflow ovens contain multiple individually heated zones, which can be individually controlled for temperature. PCBs being processed travel through the oven and through each zone at a controlled rate. Technicians adjust the conveyor speed and zone temperatures to achieve a known time and temperature profile. The profile in use may vary depending on the requirements of the PCBs being processed at the time.

== Types of reflow ovens ==
=== Infrared and convection ovens ===
In infrared reflow ovens, the heat source is normally ceramic infrared heaters above and below the conveyor, which transfer heat to the PCBs by means of radiation.

Convection ovens heat air in chambers, using that air to transfer heat to the PCBs by means of convection and conduction. They may be fan assisted to control the airflow within the oven. This indirect heating using air allows more accurate temperature control than directly heating PCBs by infrared radiation, as PCBs and components vary in infrared absorptance.

Ovens may use a combination of infrared radiative heating and convection heating, and would then be known as 'infrared convection' ovens.

Some ovens are designed to reflow PCBs in an oxygen-free atmosphere. Nitrogen (N_{2}) is a common gas used for this purpose. This minimizes oxidation of the surfaces to be soldered. The nitrogen reflow oven takes a few minutes to reduce Oxygen concentration to acceptable levels within the chamber. Thus nitrogen ovens typically have nitrogen injection in at all times which decreases defect rates.

=== Vapour phase oven ===
The heating of the PCBs is sourced by thermal energy emitted by the phase transition of a heat transfer liquid (e. g. PFPE) condensing on the PCBs. The liquid used is chosen with a desired boiling point in mind to suit the solder alloy to be reflowed.

Some advantages of vapour phase soldering are:

- High energy efficiency due to the high heat transfer coefficient of vapour phase media
- Soldering is oxygen-free. There is no need for any protective gas (e.g. nitrogen)
- No overheating of assemblies. The maximum temperature assemblies can reach is limited by the boiling point of the medium.

This is also known as condensation soldering.

=== Pressure Curing Ovens ===
Pressure curing ovens, or Autoclave, is widely utilized to minimize voiding and improve adhesion strength in bonding processes. Pressure cure ovens are typically employed in die attach and underfill applications. Increasing pressure during the curing process removes voids.

In a pressure cure process, air is pressurized in a rigid vessel or chamber while heating or cooling with forced convection. Heaters, heat exchangers, and blowers are mounted internal to the pressure vessel, continuously circulating air across the pressure chamber providing consistent heat transfer to the product. Upon completion of the curing process, pressure is relieved and the product cools.

Pressure cure ovens can utilize air or nitrogen as the pressurizing agent.

=== Vacuum Reflow Ovens ===
Traditional reflow can be augmented by the addition of a late-stage vacuum chamber. Introducing a vacuum chamber to the reflow process allows voids and bubbles to escape, significantly reducing voiding in solder joints and interfaces.

During the vacuum process, the circuit board is stationary, assuring no shifting parts. Smooth travel into and out of the vacuum chamber, minimizing vibration, is critical.

Employing heat inside the vacuum chamber allows peak temperatures to be achieved during vacuum, assuring shorter time above liquidous and greater process flexibility. High vacuum chamber temperatures also prevent flux buildup inside the chamber.

Advanced vacuum reflow ovens employ multiple conveyor systems allowing higher throughput by optimizing transfer time into the vacuum chamber, dual rail processing, and closed-loop vacuum pumps to prevent solder and flux spatter.

=== Formic Acid Reflow Ovens ===
Formic acid reflow ovens operate similarly to a traditionally reflow oven, with the addition of formic acid vapor injection into the key soak zones for flux-free reflow and vapor soldering. Upon injection, the formic acid removes any oxides present on the metal prior to reflow.

Formic acid concentration is maintained by a bubbler system that is monitored in real time to provide stable and consistent formic concentrations to within 0.5% in the process chamber.

Formic acid reflow ovens employ sets of double doors at the oven’s entrance and exit to dramatically reduce process gas consumption. During production, only one door opens at a time, thus isolating the process chamber and lowering nitrogen and formic acid consumption.

== Thermal profiling ==
Thermal profiling is the act of measuring several points on a circuit board to determine the thermal excursion it takes through the soldering process. In the electronics manufacturing industry, SPC (statistical process control) helps determine if the process is in control, measured against the reflow parameters defined by the soldering technologies and component requirements.

== See also ==
- Reflow soldering
- Thermal profiling

== References and further reading ==
=== General references ===
- "T.Bazouni: Reflow Soldering". Archived from the original on 2008-06-18.
