= Ultrasonic soldering =

Ultrasonic soldering (U/S soldering) is a flux-less soldering process that uses ultrasonic energy, without the need for chemicals to solder materials, such as glass, ceramics, and composites, hard to solder metals and other sensitive components which cannot be soldered using conventional means.

Ultrasonic soldering is finding growing application in soldering of metals and ceramics from solar photovoltaics and medical shape memory alloys to specialized electronic and sensor packages. It has been used since 1955 to solder aluminum and other metals without the use of flux.

== Process ==
Ultrasonic soldering is a distinctly different process than ultrasonic welding. Ultrasonic welding uses ultrasonic energy to join parts without adding any kind of filler material while ultrasonic soldering uses external heating to melt filler metal materials, namely solders, to form a joint.

Ultrasonic soldering can be done with either a specialized soldering iron or a specialized solder pot. In either case the process can be automated for large-scale production or can be done by hand for prototyping or repair work. Initially, U/S soldering was aimed at joining aluminum and other metals; however, with the emergence of active solders, a much wider range of metals, ceramics and glass can now be soldered.

Ultrasonic soldering uses either ultrasonically coupled heated solder iron tips (0.5—10 mm) or ultrasonically coupled solder baths. In these devices, piezoelectric crystals are used to generate high frequency (20—60 kHz) acoustic waves in molten solder layers or batch, to mechanically disrupt oxides that form on the molten solder surfaces. The tips for ultrasonic soldering irons are also coupled to a heating element while the piezoelectric crystal is thermally isolated, in order to prevent degradation of the piezoelectric element. Ultrasonic soldering iron tips can heat (up to 450 °C) while mechanically oscillating at 20—60 kHz. This soldering tip can melt solder filler metals as acoustic vibrations are induced in the molten solder pool. The vibration and cavitation in the molten solder then permits solders to wet and adhere to many metal surfaces.

The acoustic energy created by the solder tip or ultrasonic solder pot works via cavitation of the molten solder which mechanically disrupts oxide layers on the solder layers themselves and on metal surfaces being joined.

Cavitation in the molten solder pool can be very effective in disrupting the oxides on many metals, however, it is not effective when soldering to ceramics and glass since they themselves are oxides or other non-metal compound that cannot be disrupted since they are the base materials. In the cases of soldering direct to glasses and ceramics, ultrasonic soldering filler metals need to be modified with active elements such as In, Ti, Hf, Zr and rare earth elements (Ce, La, and Lu). Solders when alloyed with these elements are called active solders since they directly act on the glass/ceramic surfaces to create a bond.

== Adoption ==
The use of ultrasonic soldering is expanding, since it is clean and flux-less in combination with active solders being specified for joining assemblies where either corrosive flux can be trapped or otherwise disrupt operation or contaminate clean production environments or there are dissimilar materials / metals / ceramic / glasses being joined. To be effective in adhering to surfaces, active solder's own nascent oxide on melting need to be disrupted and ultrasonic agitation is well suited.
