= Pegler Yorkshire =

British manufacturer of engineering products

Pegler Yorkshire company logo

Pegler Yorkshire is a British manufacturer of valves and other engineering products. It is part of the Flow Control division of Aalberts.

The company has its head office in Doncaster, with four manufacturing sites in Leeds, Doncaster, Budapest and Jiangmen. In 2012, it employed over 1400 people.

== History ==
Pegler Yorkshire was created in 2009 by the merger of Pegler Ltd and Yorkshire Fittings Ltd.

=== As Peglers Limited ===
Pegler Ltd. historic logo

Pegler Bros. & Company was founded in 1899 by Francis "Frank" Pegler (d. 1938) of the Northern Rubber Company of Retford, Nottinghamshire, to manufacture plumbing fittings. The company was incorporated as Pegler Bros. & Company (Doncaster) Limited in 1914 and renamed "Peglers Limited" in 1932. In 1933, it employed 1,100 people. It became a public company in 1935. Another of the founders, Francis Egerton Pegler, died on 16 February 1957. The company merged with another plumbing manufacturer in 1968 to become Pegler-Hattersley.

=== As Yorkshire Fittings Ltd ===
Yorkshire Fittings Ltd. historic logo

The "Yorkshire" brand of plumbing fittings belonged to Yorkshire Copper Works Ltd of Leeds. This company was founded in 1909 on the site of the former Elmore's Depositing Co., to manufacture copper and brass tubes for boilers. The company developed corrosion-resistant alloy products such as "Bemal" brass condenser tubes, "Leespec" copper boiler tubes and "Gumal" copper/tin tubes. In 1934, the "Yorkshire" solder-ring pipe fitting was patented and launched. In 1954, the Register of Trade Marks ruled that a geographical name such as "Yorkshire" was not sufficiently distinctive to be registered as a brand name, but this did not stop it becoming a generic term for this type of pipe fitting.

In 1958, the works merged with the Metals Division of Imperial Chemical Industries (ICI) to form Yorkshire Imperial Metals. Yorkshire Copper Works (Holdings), representing the copper works, owned 50% and ICI owned the other 50%. In 1962 ICI created Imperial Metal Industries (IMI) to look after its half-share of YIM. In 1968 IMI bought Yorkshire's half-share in the business. Yorkshire Fittings then became IMI Yorkshire Fittings.

=== Factory Closure Announcement ===
On August 8, 2024, Pegler Yorkshire, a prominent British manufacturer of plumbing and heating products, announced the proposed closure of its Belmont Works factory in Balby, Doncaster. This decision comes after 120 years of operation and is part of a strategic move by its parent company, Aalberts, to enhance global competitiveness. The closure could result in the relocation of manufacturing operations to other Aalberts facilities, although the UK distribution center at Manvers will remain operational.
