= Immersion silver plating =

Immersion silver plating (or IAg plating) is a surface plating process that creates a thin layer of silver over copper objects. It consists in dipping the object briefly into a solution containing silver ions.

Immersion silver plating is used by the electronics industry in manufacture of printed circuit boards (PCBs), to protect copper conductors from oxidation and improve solderability.

== Advantages ==
Immersion silver coatings have excellent surface planarity, compared to more traditional coating processes such as hot air solder leveling (HASL). They also have low losses in high-frequency applications due to the skin effect.

== Disadvantages ==
On the other hand, silver coatings will degrade over time due to oxidation or air contaminants such as sulfur compounds and chlorine. A problem peculiar to silver coatings is the formation of silver whiskers under electric fields, which may short out components.

== Specifications ==
IPC Standard: IPC-4553

== See also ==
- Wave soldering
- Reflow soldering
- Electroless nickel immersion gold
- Hot air solder leveling (HASL)
- Organic solderability preservative
