= Tin-silver-copper =

Alloy used as a lead-free solder

Tin-silver-copper (Sn-Ag-Cu, also known as SAC), is a lead-free (Pb-free) alloy commonly used for electronic solder. It is the main choice for lead-free surface-mount technology (SMT) assembly in the industry, as it is near eutectic, with adequate thermal fatigue properties, strength, and wettability. Lead-free solder has gained attention as the environmental effects of lead in industrial products have been recognized, and as a result of Europe's RoHS legislation to remove lead and other hazardous materials from electronics. Japanese electronics companies have also looked at Pb-free solder for its industrial advantages.

Typical alloys are 3–4% silver, 0.5–0.7% copper, and the balance (95%+) tin. For example, the common "SAC305" solder is 3.0% silver and 0.5% copper. Cheaper alternatives with less silver are used in some applications, such as SAC105 and SAC0307 (0.3% silver, 0.7% copper), at the expense of a somewhat higher melting point.

In addition to traditional silver-containing SAC alloys, silver-free tin-copper based alloys with minor additions of nickel and germanium have been developed to enhance mechanical and reliability properties while reducing material costs. One such alloy, SN100CV (Sn-1.5Bi-0.7Cu-Ni-Ge), is designed as a drop-in replacement for SAC305 solder in surface-mount assembly processes. According to standardized IPC testing, SN100CV solder paste demonstrates excellent flux activity, wetting, and slump stability suitable for reflow soldering. It exhibits strong corrosion resistance evidenced by high surface insulation resistance and electrochemical migration resistance after prolonged environmental stress. These properties suggest improved long-term joint reliability and mechanical stability, making SN100CV a viable alternative to traditional SAC alloys in various electronic assembly applications.

Despite widespread regulatory encouragement, the transition to lead-free solders such as SAC alloys faced significant technical challenges. Misconceptions about melting points, solder joint reliability, and equipment compatibility initially complicated manufacturing adoption. Practical industry experience has shown that selecting eutectic or near-eutectic alloys and carefully adapting reflow processes and flux chemistry are critical to achieving reliable solder joints. Challenges including fillet lifting, corrosion potential, and changes in mechanical stress response required focused research and process optimization. Continued development and understanding of these phenomena have enabled SAC solders to achieve performance levels comparable to traditional tin-lead solders in many applications.

== History ==
In 2000, there were several lead-free assemblies and chip products initiatives being driven by the Japan Electronic Industries Development Association (JEIDA) and Waste Electrical and Electronic Equipment Directive (WEEE). These initiatives resulted in tin-silver-copper alloys being considered and tested as lead-free solder ball alternatives for array product assemblies.

In 2003, tin-silver-copper was being used as a lead-free solder. However, its performance was criticized because it left a dull, irregular finish and it was difficult to keep the copper content under control. In 2005, tin-silver-copper alloys constituted approximately 65% of lead-free alloys used in the industry and this percentage has been increasing. Large companies such as Sony and Intel switched from using lead-containing solder to a tin-silver-copper alloy.

== Constraints and tradeoffs ==
The process requirements for (Pb-free) SAC solders and Sn-Pb solders are different both materially and logistically for electronic assembly. In addition, the reliability of Sn-Pb solders is well established, while SAC solders are still undergoing study, (though much work has been done to justify the use of SAC solders, such as the iNEMI Lead Free Solder Project).

One important difference is that Pb-free soldering requires higher temperatures and increased process control to achieve the same results as that of the tin-lead method. The melting point of SAC alloys is 217–220 °C, or about 34 °C higher than the melting point of the eutectic tin-lead (63/37) alloy. This requires peak temperatures in the range of 235–245 °C to achieve wetting and wicking.

Some of the components susceptible to SAC assembly temperatures are electrolytic capacitors, connectors, opto-electronics, and older style plastic components. However, a number of companies have started offering 260 °C compatible components to meet the requirements of Pb-free solders. iNEMI has proposed that a good target for development purposes would be around 260 °C.

Also, SAC solders are alloyed with a larger number of metals so there is the potential for a far wider variety of intermetallics to be present in a solder joint. These more complex compositions can result in solder joint microstructures that are not as thoroughly studied as current tin-lead solder microstructures. These concerns are magnified by the unintentional use of lead-free solders in either processes designed solely for tin-lead solders or environments where material interactions are poorly understood. For example, the reworking of a tin-lead solder joint with Pb-free solder. These mixed-finish possibilities could negatively impact the solder's reliability.

== Advantages ==
SAC solders have outperformed high-Pb solders C4 joints in ceramic ball grid array (CBGA) systems, which are ball-grid arrays with a ceramic substrate. The CBGA showed consistently better results in thermal cycling for Pb-free alloys. The findings also show that SAC alloys are proportionately better in thermal fatigue as the thermal cycling range decreases. SAC performs better than Sn-Pb at the less extreme cycling conditions. Another advantage of SAC is that it appears to be more resistant to gold embrittlement than Sn-Pb. In test results, the strength of the joints is substantially higher for the SAC alloys than the Sn-Pb alloy. Also, the failure mode is changed from a partially brittle joint separation to a ductile tearing with the SAC.

== Recent advances (post-2020) ==
Researchers continue to explore minor alloying elements (Sb, In, Bi, rare earths, Co, Ce, etc.) added to SAC solders to refine microstructure, modify intermetallic phases, and enhance mechanical behavior. For example, antimony (Sb) additions have been shown to increase tensile strength and creep resistance in Sn-3.5Ag-0.7Cu alloys by adjusting microstructural evolution under load. This has been confirmed in recent work deploying advanced characterization and mechanical testing. A study also demonstrated that doping SAC solder with graphene or CuO nanoparticles can further refine microstructure and improve reliability under thermal stress, indicating composite approaches are gaining traction.

Recent reviews emphasize the development of micro/nanoreinforced Sn-based composite solders where tailored particles enhance key attributes such as melting behavior, wettability, mechanical strength, and corrosion resistance. A 2025 review provides a useful overview.
