= Dip soldering =

Solder by immersion in a bath of molten solder

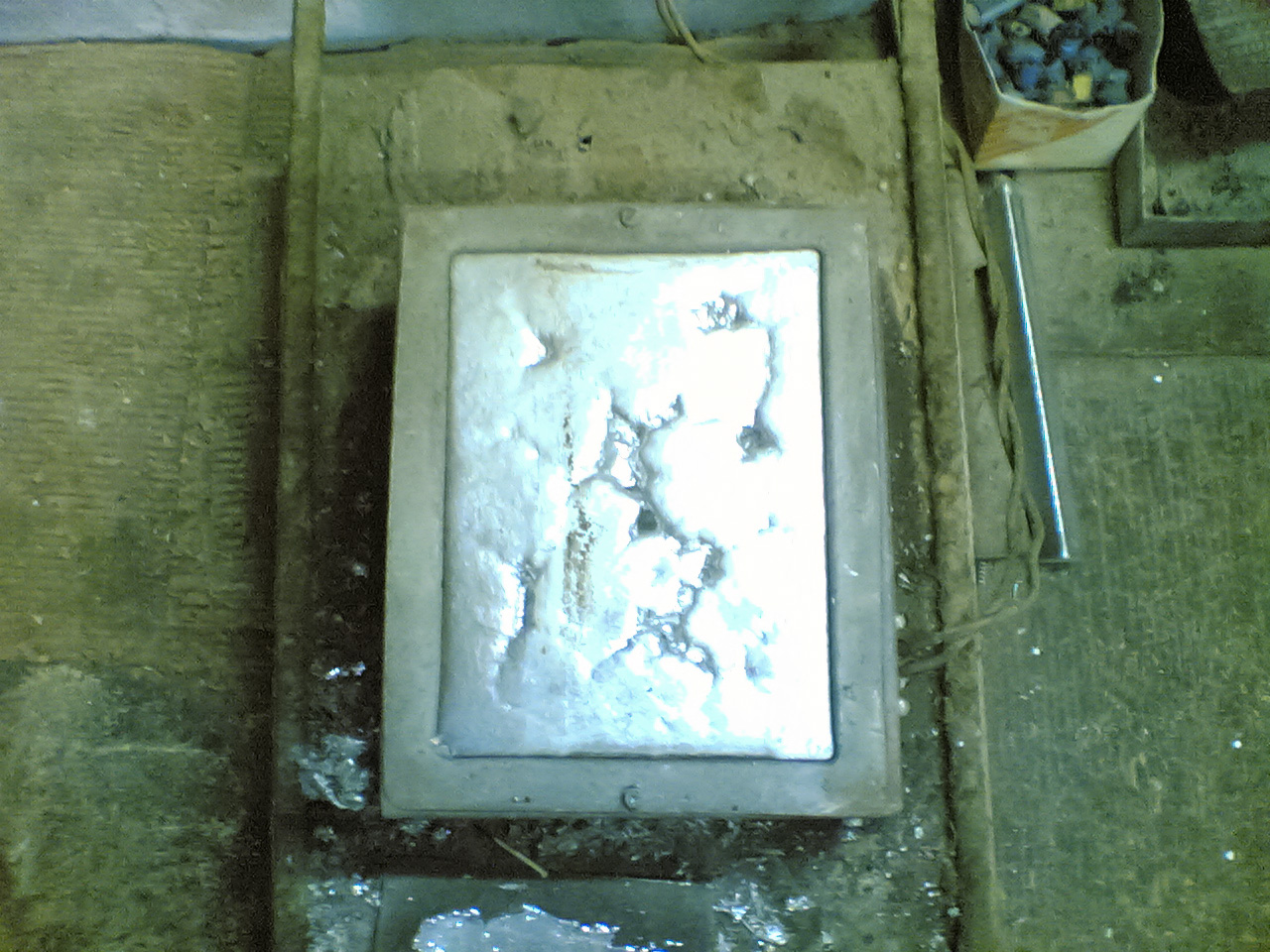
Dip soldering apparatus.

Dip soldering is a small-scale soldering process by which electronic components are soldered to a printed circuit board (PCB) to form an electronic assembly. The solder wets to the exposed metallic areas of the board (those not protected with solder mask), creating a mechanical and electrical connection.

Dip soldering is used for both through-hole printed circuit assemblies, and surface mount. It is one of the cheapest methods to solder and is extensively used in the small scale industries of developing countries .

Dip soldering is a manual equivalent of automated wave soldering. The apparatus required is just a small tank containing molten solder. A PCB with mounted components is dipped manually into the tank so that the molten solder sticks to the exposed metallic areas of the board.

== Dip solder process ==
Dip soldering is accomplished by submerging parts to be joined into a molten solder bath. Thus, all components surfaces are coated with filler metal. Solders have low surface tension and high wetting capability. There are many types of solders, each used for different applications:

- Lead–silver is used for strength at higher-than-room temperature.
- Tin–lead is used as a general-purpose solder
- Tin–zinc is used for aluminium
- Cadmium–silver is used for strength at high temperatures
- Zinc–aluminium is used for aluminium and corrosion resistance
- Tin–silver and tin–bismuth are used for electronics.

The molten bath can be any suitable filler metal, but the selection is usually confined to the lower melting point elements. The most common dip soldering operations use zinc-aluminum and tin-lead solders.

- Solder pot metal: cast iron or steel, electrically heated.
- Bath temperature: 220 to 260 °C (for binary tin-lead alloys) or 350 to 400 °C (for lead-free alloys)
- Solder composition: 60% Sn, 40% Pb or eutectic alloy.

== Process schematic ==
The workpieces to be joined are treated with cleaning flux. Then the workpiece is mounted in the workholding device and immersed in the molten solder for 2 to 12 seconds. The workpiece is often agitated to aid the flow of the solder. The workpiece holder must allow an inclination of 3° to 5° so that the solder may run off to ensure a smooth finish.

== Workpiece geometry ==
This process is generally limited to all-metal work pieces, although other materials, such as circuit boards can also tolerate momentary contact with the hot molten solder without damage.

== Setup and equipment ==
There is not much equipment or setup needed for dip soldering. All that is needed is the solder pot with its temperature control panel, a bath of molten solder, and the work-holding device. Usually the work-holding device is custom made for each respective workpiece for either manual or automated dipping.

== Solderability ==
Some materials are easier to solder than others. Copper, silver, and gold are easy to solder. Iron and nickel are a little more difficult. Titanium, magnesium, cast irons, steels, ceramics, and graphites are hard to solder. However, if they are first plated they are more easily soldered. An example of this is tin-plating, in which a steel is sheet coated with tin so that it can be soldered more easily.

== Applications ==
Dip soldering is used extensively in the electronics industry. However, they have a limited service use at elevated temperatures because of the low melting point of the filler metals. Soldered materials do not have much strength and are therefore not used for load-bearing.
