= Electroless nickel immersion gold =

Metal plating process

Electroless nickel immersion gold (ENIG or ENi/IAu), also known as immersion gold (Au), chemical Ni/Au or soft gold, is a metal plating process used in the manufacture of printed circuit boards (PCBs), to avoid oxidation and improve the solderability of copper contacts and plated through-holes. It consists of an electroless nickel plating, covered with a thin layer of gold, which protects the nickel from oxidation. The gold is typically applied by quick immersion in a solution containing gold salts such as gold sulfites with an example being Na_{3}Au(SO_{3})_{2} or potassium gold cyanide (KAu(CN)_{2}), with a complexing agent and a stabilizer. The bath needs to be replaced after a certain number of uses and the composition of the gold bath may be patented. Some of the nickel is oxidized to Ni^{2+} while the gold is reduced to its elemental state. (A variant of this process adds a thin layer of electroless palladium over the nickel, its acronym being ENEPIG.)

ENIG can be applied before or after the solder mask, also known as "overall" or "selective chemical Ni/Au," respectively. The latter type is more common and significantly cheaper as less gold is needed to cover only the solder pads.

== Advantages and disadvantages ==
ENIG and ENEPIG are meant to replace the more conventional coatings of solder, such as hot air solder leveling (HASL/HAL). While more expensive and requiring more processing steps, they have several advantages, including excellent surface planarity (important for ball grid array component mounting), good oxidation resistance, preventing 'copper migration', and suitability for movable contacts such as membrane switches and plug-in connectors.

Early ENIG processes had poor adhesion to copper and lower solderability than HASL. In addition, a non-conductive layer containing nickel and phosphorus, known as "black pad", could form over the coating due to sulfur-containing compounds from the solder mask leaching into the plating bath.

== Standards ==
The quality and other aspects of ENIG coatings for PCBs are covered by IPC Standard 4552A, while IPC standard 7095D, about ball array connectors, covers some ENIG problems and their remediation.

== See also ==
- Immersion silver plating (IAg)
- Immersion tin plating (ISn)
- Organic solderability preservative (OSP)
- Reflow soldering
- Wave soldering
