= Organic solderability preservative =

Coating process used on printed circuit boards

Organic solderability preservative or OSP is a method for coating printed circuit boards. It uses a water-based organic compound that selectively bonds to copper and protects the copper until soldering. Compared to the traditional HASL process, OSP is applied at a lower temperature, reducing thermal stress on the board during surface finishing.

The basic principle of OSP is to form a protective organic layer on exposed copper surfaces, protecting them against oxidation before soldering.

The OSP process involves controlled processing steps designed to ensure the uniformity and quality of the protective layer. Control of the coating chemistry and processing conditions is important for consistent coating performance.

The compounds typically used are from the azole family such as benzotriazoles, imidazoles and benzimidazoles. These adsorb on copper surfaces by forming coordination bonds with copper atoms and form thicker films through the formation of copper(I)–N-heterocycle complexes. The typical film thickness used is in the tens to hundreds of nanometers.

== Soldering and handling ==
The thin, relatively uniform OSP coating preserves copper pad flatness and facilitates solder paste printing for surface-mount technology. During soldering, components of the flux dissolve the organic coating and remove copper oxides, allowing solder to wet the underlying copper and form copper–tin intermetallic compounds.

Exposure to heat can degrade the coating. Its performance through repeated thermal cycles depends on the coating chemistry and assembly conditions, including temperature, exposure time and atmosphere. OSP formulations designed for lead-free assembly can support multiple reflow soldering cycles.

Storage and handling also affect solderability. Solvents, acids, alkalis and environmental contaminants can attack the coating, so packaging materials and storage conditions need to be compatible with the finish. Direct contact with exposed pads and abrasion during handling can damage the thin protective film.

== See also ==
- Electroless nickel immersion gold (ENIG)
- Hot air solder leveling (HASL)
- Immersion silver plating (IAg)
- Immersion tin plating (ISn)
- Reflow soldering
- Wave soldering
