= Hot air solder leveling =

Finish used on printed circuit boards

HASL or HAL (for hot air (solder) leveling) is a type of finish used on printed circuit boards (PCBs).

The PCB is typically dipped into a bath of molten solder so that all exposed copper surfaces are covered by solder. Excess solder is removed by passing the PCB between hot air knives.

HASL can be applied with or without lead (Pb), but only lead-free HASL is RoHS compliant.

== Advantages of HASL ==
- Excellent wetting during component soldering.
- Avoids copper corrosion.

== Disadvantages of HASL ==
- Low planarity on vertical levelers may make this surface finish unsuitable for use with fine pitch components. Improved planarity can be achieved using a horizontal leveler.
- High thermal stress during the process may introduce defects into PCB.

== See also ==
- Electroless nickel immersion gold (ENIG)
- Immersion silver (IAg)
- Organic solderability preservative (OSP)
- Reflow soldering
- Wave soldering
