= Analog signature analysis =

Troubleshooting method for electronic circuits

Analog signature analysis is an electronic component and circuit board troubleshooting technique which applies a current-limited AC sine wave across two points of an electronic component or circuit.

The resulting current/voltage waveform is shown on a signature display using vertical deflection for current and horizontal deflection for voltage. This unique analog signature represents the overall health of the part being analyzed. By comparing the signatures of known good circuit boards to those of suspect boards, faulty nets and components can be quickly identified.

Analog signature analysis relies on a change in electrical characteristics to detect problems on a circuit board.

== See also ==
- ATE diagnostics
- Flying probe
- Power-off testing
