= Rigid needle adapter =

Function mode of a rigid needle adapter

A rigid needle adapter enables electrical contact of finest structures on printed circuit boards, typically for high-volume testing or if the test points are too close together for pogo pins (spring probes).

== See also ==
- Test probe
