= Solder ring fitting =

Object used in plumbing

A solder ring fitting, also known by the trademarked name Yorkshire fitting, is a pre-soldered capillary connector for joining copper pipes used in plumbing.

== Operation ==
To obtain functional joints, the inside of the fitting and the outside of the copper pipe are cleaned using steel wool or cleaning tape, flux paste is applied, the pipe is inserted into the fitting and heat is applied from a portable butane torch or propane torch until a ring of solder shows at the edges of the fitting. To obtain a durable joint, forced cooling should not be used. Yorkshire fittings are now made with lead-free solder.

The fittings come in a variety of configurations, such as tee-pieces, straight couplers, elbows or bends, reducers (to join pipes of different diameters), stop-ends, and there are versions with screw threads (male or female) at one end to fit taps and iron pipes.

Valves such as stoptaps & gate valves are also available in solder ring configuration.

== See also ==
- Sweat fitting
