= Soldering =

Process of joining metal pieces with heated filler metal

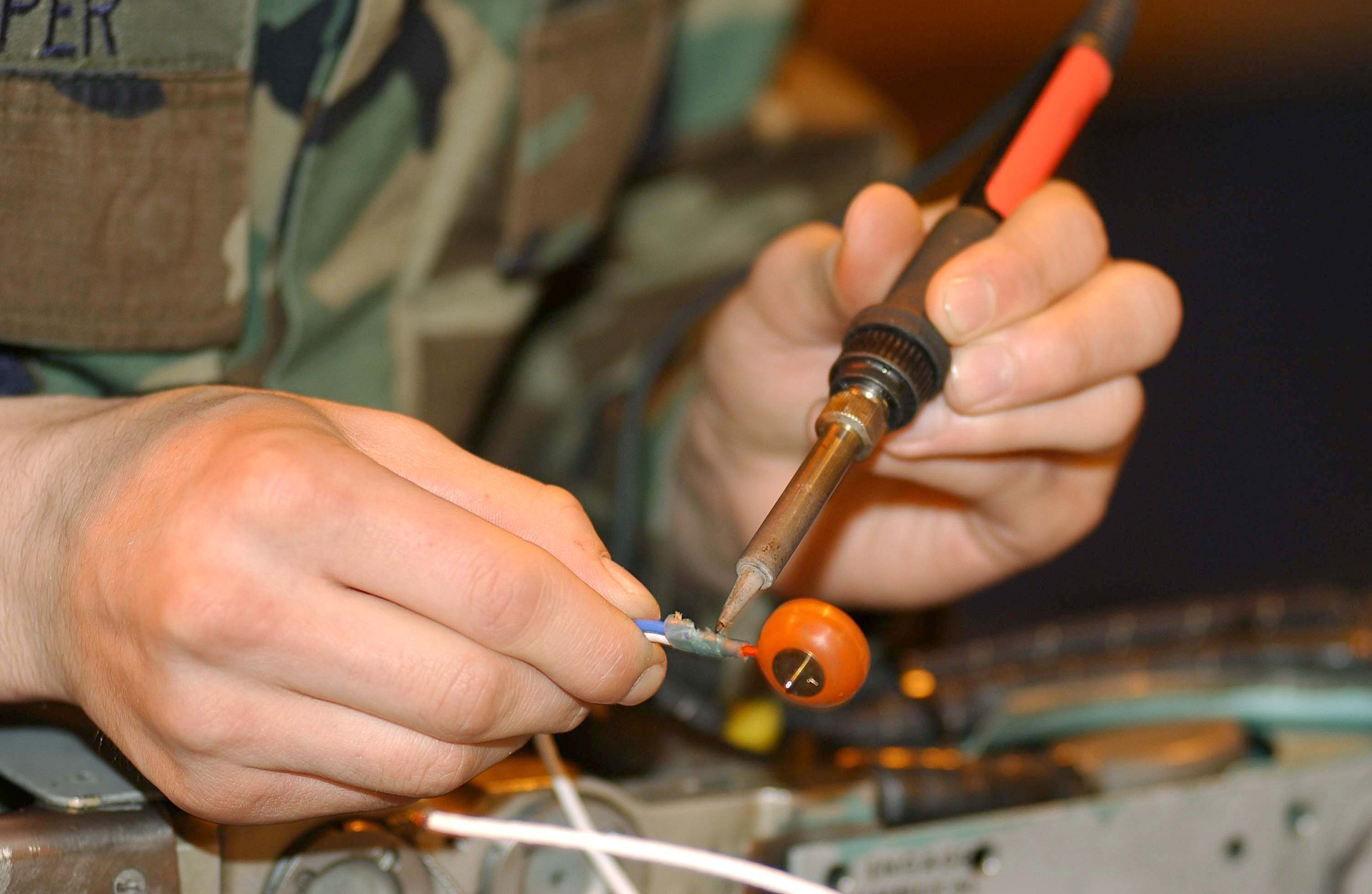
Using a soldering iron to desolder a contact from a wire

Soldering (US: /ˈsɒdərɪŋ/; UK: /ˈsoʊldərɪŋ/) joins two metal surfaces using a filler metal called solder. The surfaces are heated, melting the solder, which is then allowed to cool and solidify, creating a strong and durable joint.

Soldering is commonly used in the electronics industry for the manufacture and repair of printed circuit boards (PCBs) and other electronic components. It is also used in plumbing and metalwork, as well as in the manufacture of jewelry and other decorative items.

Various alloys are used as solder, depending on the application. Common ones include tin-lead, tin-silver, and tin-copper. Lead-free solder has become more common because of the health and environmental dangers of lead.

The temperature and method of heating play a crucial role in soldering. Different solders require different temperatures to melt, and heating must be carefully controlled to avoid damaging the materials being joined or creating weak joints.

There are several methods of heating used in soldering, including soldering irons, torches, and hot air guns. Each method has its advantages and disadvantages, and the choice depends on the application and the materials being joined.

Soldering is a skill used in many industries and hobbies, and requires a combination of technical knowledge and practical experience.

== Origins ==
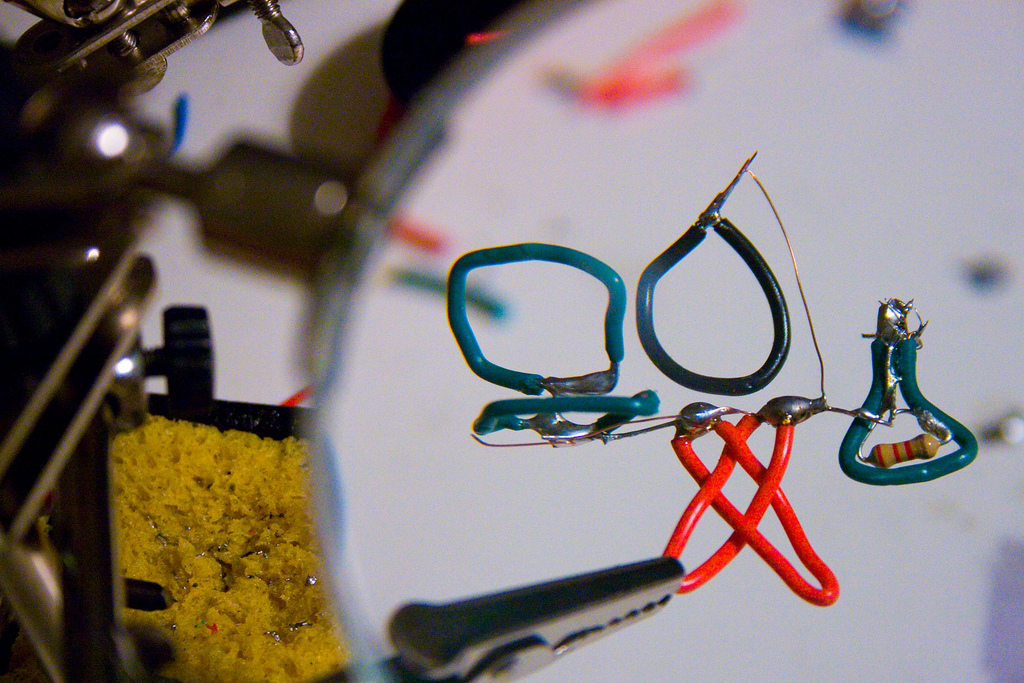
Small figurine being created by soldering

Soldering was apparently employed as early as 5,000 years ago in Mesopotamia. Soldering and brazing probably originated early in the history of metal-working, probably before 4000 BC. Sumerian swords from c. 3000 BC were assembled using hard soldering.

Soldering was historically used to make jewelry, cookware and cooking tools, assembling stained glass, as well as other uses.

== Applications ==
Soldering is used in plumbing, electronics, and metalwork from flashing to jewelry and musical instruments.

Soldering provides reasonably permanent but reversible connections between copper pipes in plumbing systems as well as joints in sheet metal objects such as food cans, roof flashing, rain gutters and automobile radiators.

Jewelry components, machine tools and some refrigeration and plumbing components are often assembled and repaired by the higher temperature silver soldering process. Small mechanical parts are often soldered or brazed as well. Soldering is also used to join lead came and copper foil in stained glass work.

Electronic soldering connects electrical wiring to devices, and electronic components to printed circuit boards. Electronic connections may be hand-soldered with a soldering iron. Automated methods such as wave soldering or use of ovens can make many joints on a complex circuit board in one operation, vastly reducing production cost of electronic devices.

Musical instruments, especially brass and woodwind instruments, use a combination of soldering and brazing in their assembly. Brass bodies are often soldered together, while keywork and braces are most often brazed.

The USSR and Russian military used zinc coffins sealed with solder to transport the dead.

== Solderability ==
The solderability of a substrate is a measure of the ease with which a soldered joint can be made to that material.

Some metals are easier to solder than others. Copper, zinc, brass, silver and gold are easy. Iron, mild steel and nickel are next in difficulty. Because of their thin, strong oxide films, stainless steel and some aluminium alloys are even more difficult to solder. Titanium, magnesium, cast irons, some high-carbon steels, ceramics, and graphite can be soldered only with a process similar to joining carbides: they are first plated with a suitable metallic element that induces interfacial bonding.

== Solders ==
Soldering filler materials are available in many different alloys for differing applications. In electronics assembly, the eutectic alloy with 63% tin and 37% lead (or 60/40, which is almost identical in melting point) has been the alloy of choice. Other alloys are used for plumbing, mechanical assembly, and other applications. Some examples of soft-solder are tin-lead for general purposes, tin-zinc for joining aluminium, lead-silver for strength at higher than room temperature, cadmium-silver for strength at high temperatures, zinc-aluminium for aluminium and corrosion resistance, and tin-silver and tin-bismuth for electronics.

A eutectic formulation has advantages when applied to soldering: the liquidus and solidus temperatures are the same, so there is no plastic phase, and it has the lowest possible melting point. Having the lowest possible melting point minimizes heat stress on electronic components during soldering. And, having no plastic phase allows for quicker wetting as the solder heats up, and quicker setup as the solder cools. A non-eutectic formulation must remain still as the temperature drops through the liquidus and solidus temperatures. Any movement during the plastic phase may result in cracks, resulting in an unreliable joint.

Common solder formulations based on tin and lead are listed below. The fraction represent percentage of tin first, then lead, totaling 100%:

- 63/37: melts at 183 °C (361 °F) (eutectic: the only mixture that melts at a point, instead of over a range)
- 60/40: melts between 183–190 °C (361–374 °F)
- 50/50: melts between 183–215 °C (361–419 °F)

For environmental reasons and the introduction of regulations such as the European RoHS (Restriction of Hazardous Substances Directive), lead-free solders are becoming more widely used. They are also suggested anywhere young children may come into contact with (since young children are likely to place things into their mouths), or for outdoor use where rain and other precipitation may wash the lead into the groundwater. Unfortunately, common lead-free solders are not eutectic formulations, melting at around 220 °C (428 °F), making it more difficult to create reliable joints with them.

Other common solders include low-temperature formulations (often containing bismuth), which are often used to join previously soldered assemblies without unsoldering earlier connections, and high-temperature formulations (usually containing silver) which are used for high-temperature operation or for first assembly of items which must not become unsoldered during subsequent operations. Alloying silver with other metals changes the melting point, adhesion and wetting characteristics, and tensile strength. Of all the brazing alloys, silver solders have the greatest strength and the broadest applications. Specialty alloys are available with properties such as higher strength, the ability to solder aluminium, better electrical conductivity, and higher corrosion resistance.

=== Soldering vs. brazing ===
Brazing and soldering processes classification chart

There are three forms of soldering, each requiring progressively higher temperatures and producing an increasingly stronger joint strength:

1. soft soldering, which originally used a tin-lead alloy as the filler metal
2. silver soldering, which uses an alloy containing silver
3. brazing which uses a brass alloy for the filler

The alloy of the filler metal for each type of soldering can be adjusted to modify the melting temperature of the filler. Soldering differs significantly from gluing in that the filler metals directly bond with the surfaces of the workpieces at the junction to form a bond that is both electrically conductive and gas- and liquid-tight.

Soft soldering is characterized by having a melting point of the filler metal below approximately 400 °C (752 °F), whereas silver soldering and brazing use higher temperatures, typically requiring a flame or carbon arc torch to achieve the melting of the filler. Soft solder filler metals are typically alloys (often containing lead) that have liquidus temperatures below 350 °C (662 °F).

In this soldering process, heat is applied to the parts to be joined, causing the solder to melt and to bond to the workpieces in a surface alloying process called wetting. In stranded wire, the solder is drawn up into the wire between the strands by capillary action in a process called 'wicking'. Capillary action also takes place when the workpieces are very close together or touching. The joint's tensile strength is dependent on the filler metal used; in electrical soldering little tensile strength comes from the added solder which is why it is advised that wires be twisted or folded together before soldering to provide some mechanical strength for a joint. A good solder joint produces an electrically conductive, water- and gas-tight join.

Each type of solder offers advantages and disadvantages. Soft solder is so called because of the soft lead that is its primary ingredient. Soft soldering uses the lowest temperatures (and so thermally stresses components the least) but does not make a strong joint and is unsuitable for mechanical load-bearing applications. It is also unsuitable for high-temperature applications as it loses strength, and eventually melts. Silver soldering, as used by jewelers, machinists and in some plumbing applications, requires the use of a torch or other high-temperature source, and is much stronger than soft soldering. Brazing provides the strongest of the non-welded joints but also requires the hottest temperatures to melt the filler metal, requiring a torch or other high temperature source and darkened goggles to protect the eyes from the bright light produced by the white-hot work. It is often used to repair cast-iron objects, wrought-iron furniture, etc.

Soldering operations can be performed with hand tools, one joint at a time, or en masse on a production line. Hand soldering is typically performed with a soldering iron, soldering gun, or a torch, or occasionally a hot-air pencil. Sheetmetal work was traditionally done with "soldering coppers" directly heated by a flame, with sufficient stored heat in the mass of the soldering copper to complete a joint; gas torches (e.g. butane or propane) or electrically heated soldering irons are more convenient. All soldered joints require the same elements of cleaning of the metal parts to be joined, fitting up the joint, heating the parts, applying flux, applying the filler, removing heat and holding the assembly still until the filler metal has completely solidified. Depending on the nature of flux material used and the application, cleaning of the joint may be required after it has cooled.

Each solder alloy has characteristics that work best for certain applications, notably strength and conductivity, and each type of solder and alloy has different melting temperatures. The term silver solder denotes the type of solder that is used. Some soft solders are "silver-bearing" alloys used to solder silver-plated items. Lead-based solders should not be used on precious metals because the lead dissolves the metal and disfigures it.

The distinction between soldering and brazing is based on the melting temperature of the filler alloy. A temperature of 450 °C is usually used as a practical demarcation between soldering and brazing. Soft soldering can be done with a heated iron whereas the other methods typically require a higher temperature torch or a furnace to melt the filler metal.

Different equipment is usually required since a soldering iron cannot achieve high enough temperatures for hard soldering or brazing. Brazing filler metal is stronger than silver solder, which is stronger than lead-based soft solder. Brazing solders are formulated primarily for strength, silver solder is used by jewelers to protect the precious metal and by machinists and refrigeration technicians for its tensile strength but lower melting temperature than brazing, and the primary benefit of soft solder is the low temperature used (to prevent heat damage to electronic components and insulation).

Since the joint is produced using a metal with a lower melting temperature than the workpiece, the joint will weaken as the ambient temperature approaches the melting point of the filler metal. For that reason, the higher temperature processes produce joints which are effective at higher temperatures. Brazed connections can be as strong or nearly as strong as the parts they connect, even at elevated temperatures.

=== Silver soldering ===
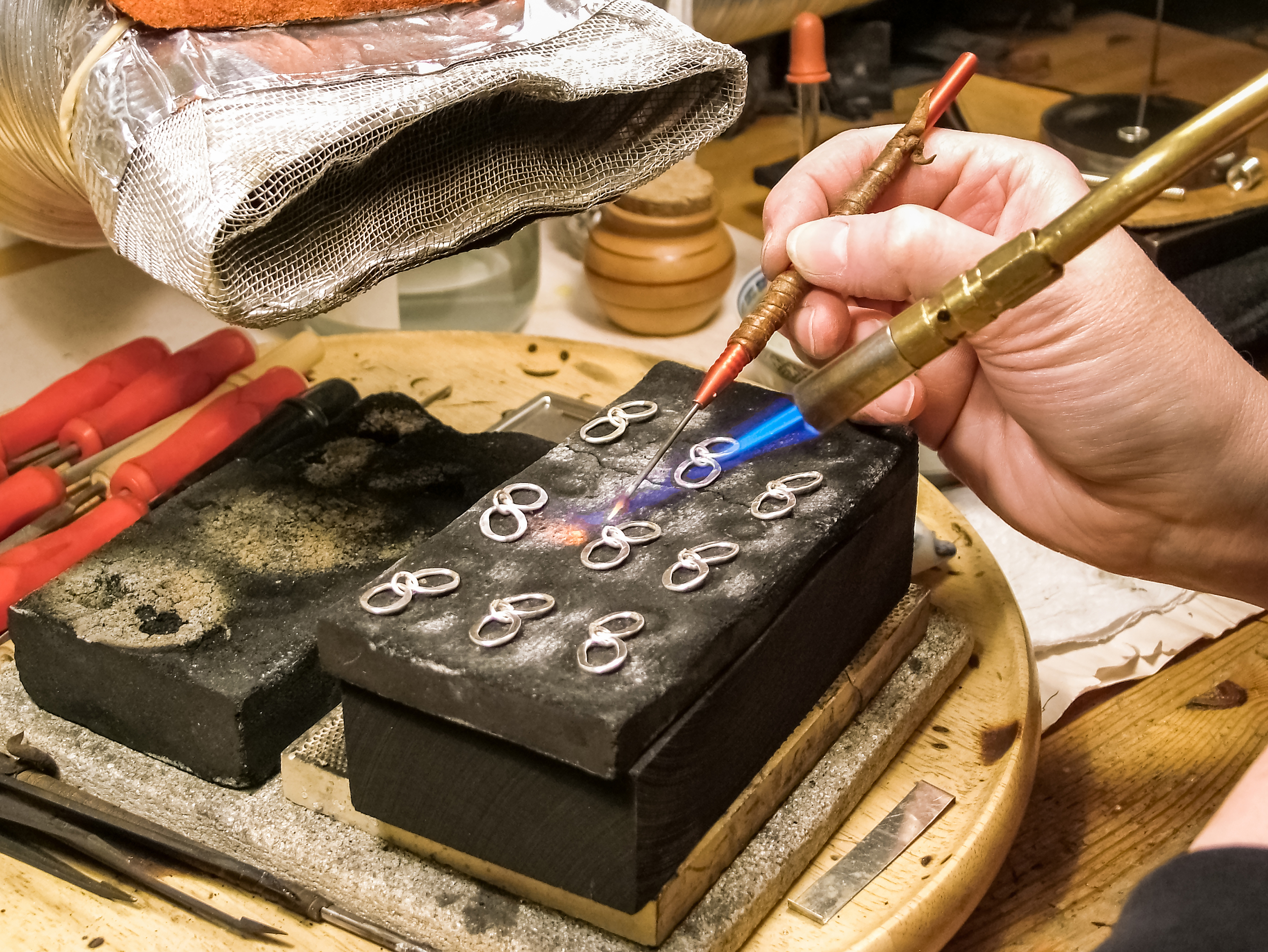
A silversmith hard soldering of silver rings using flux and silver solder wire.

"Hard soldering" or "silver soldering" is used to join precious and semi-precious metals such as gold, silver, brass, and copper. The solder is usually described as easy, medium, or hard in reference to its melting temperature, not the strength of the joint. Extra-easy solder contains 56% silver and has a melting point of 618 °C (1,145 °F). Extra-hard solder has 80% silver and melts at 740 °C (1,370 °F). If multiple joints are needed, then the jeweler will start with hard or extra-hard solder and switch to lower-temperature solders for later joints.

Silver solder is somewhat absorbed by the surrounding metal, resulting in a joint that is actually stronger than the metal being joined. The metal being joined must be perfectly flush, as silver solder cannot normally be used as a filler and will not fill gaps.

Another difference between brazing and soldering is how the solder is applied. In brazing, one generally uses rods that are touched to the joint while being heated. With silver soldering, small pieces of solder wire are placed onto the metal prior to heating. A flux, often made of boric acid and denatured alcohol, is used to keep the metal and solder clean and to prevent the solder from moving before it melts.

When silver solder melts, it tends to flow towards the area of greatest heat. Jewelers can somewhat control the direction the solder moves by leading it with a torch; it will even sometimes run straight up along a seam.

=== Mechanical and aluminium soldering ===
A number of solder materials, primarily zinc alloys, are used for soldering aluminium and alloys and to a lesser extent steel and zinc. This mechanical soldering is similar to a low temperature brazing operation, in that the mechanical characteristics of the joint are reasonably good and it can be used for structural repairs of those materials.

The American Welding Society defines brazing as using filler metals with melting points over 450 °C (842 °F) — or, by the traditional definition in the United States, above 800 °F (427 °C). Aluminium soldering alloys generally have melting temperatures around 730 °F (388 °C). This soldering / brazing operation can use a propane torch heat source.

These materials are often advertised as "aluminium welding", but the process does not involve melting the base metal, and therefore is not properly a weld.

United States Military Standard or MIL-SPEC specification MIL-R-4208 defines one standard for these zinc-based brazing/soldering alloys. A number of products meet this specification. or very similar performance standards.

== Flux ==
The purpose of flux is to facilitate the soldering process. One of the obstacles to a successful solder joint is an impurity at the site of the joint; for example, dirt, oil or oxidation. The impurities can be removed by mechanical cleaning or by chemical means, but the elevated temperatures required to melt the filler metal (the solder) encourages the work piece (and the solder) to re-oxidize. This effect is accelerated as the soldering temperatures increase and can completely prevent the solder from joining to the workpiece. One of the earliest forms of flux was charcoal, which acts as a reducing agent and helps prevent oxidation during the soldering process. Some fluxes go beyond the simple prevention of oxidation and also provide some form of chemical cleaning (corrosion). Many fluxes also act as a wetting agent in the soldering process, reducing the surface tension of the molten solder and causing it to flow and wet the workpieces more easily.

For many years, the most common type of flux used in electronics (soft soldering) was rosin-based, using the rosin from selected pine trees. It was nearly ideal in that it was non-corrosive and non-conductive at normal temperatures but became mildly reactive (corrosive) at elevated soldering temperatures. Plumbing and automotive applications, among others, typically use an acid-based (hydrochloric acid) flux which provides rather aggressive cleaning of the joint. These fluxes cannot be used in electronics because their residues are conductive leading to unintended electrical connections, and because they will eventually dissolve small diameter wires. Citric acid is an excellent water-soluble acid-type flux for copper and electronics but must be washed off afterwards.

Fluxes for soft solder are currently available in three basic formulations:

- Water-soluble fluxes – higher activity fluxes which can be removed with water after soldering (no VOCs required for removal).
- No-clean fluxes – mild enough to not "require" removal due to their non-conductive and non-corrosive residues. These fluxes are called "no-clean" because the residue left after the solder operation is non-conductive and will not cause electrical shorts; nevertheless they leave a plainly visible white residue. No-clean flux residue is acceptable on all 3 classes of PCBs as defined by IPC-610 provided it does not inhibit visual inspection, access to test points, or have a wet, tacky or excessive residue that may spread onto other areas. Connector mating surfaces must also be free of flux residue. Fingerprints in no-clean residue are a class 3 defect
- Traditional rosin fluxes – available in non-activated (R), mildly activated (RMA) and activated (RA) formulations. RA and RMA fluxes contain rosin combined with an activating agent, typically an acid, which increases the wettability of metals to which it is applied by removing existing oxides. The residue resulting from the use of RA flux is corrosive and must be cleaned. RMA flux is formulated to result in a residue which is less corrosive, so that cleaning becomes optional, though usually preferred. R flux is still less active and even less corrosive.

Flux suitability depends on the soldering process. A mild no-clean flux may be suitable for controlled production equipment but insufficient for more variable hand-soldering conditions.

== Heating methods ==
Different types of soldering tools are made for specific applications. The required heat can be generated from burning fuel or from an electrically operated heating element or by passing an electric current through the item to be soldered. Another method for soldering is to place solder and flux at the locations of joints in the object to be soldered, then heat the entire object in an oven to melt the solder; toaster ovens and hand-held infrared lights have been used by hobbyists to replicate production soldering processes on a much smaller scale. A third method of soldering is to use a solder pot where the part (with flux) is dipped in a small heated iron cup of liquid solder, or a pump in a bath of liquid solder produces an elevated "wave" of solder which the part is quickly passed through. Wave soldering uses surface tension to keep solder from bridging the insulating gaps between the copper lines of flux-coated printed wiring boards/printed circuit boards.

The electric soldering iron is widely used for hand-soldering, consisting of a heating element in contact with the "iron" (a larger mass of metal, usually copper) which is in contact with the working tip made of copper. Usually, soldering irons can be fitted with a variety of tips, ranging from blunt, to very fine, to chisel heads for hot-cutting plastics rather than soldering. Plain copper tips are subject to erosion/dissolution in hot solder, and may be plated with pure iron to prevent that. The simplest irons do not have temperature regulation. Small irons rapidly cool when used to solder to, say, a metal chassis, while large irons have tips too cumbersome for working on printed circuit boards (PCBs) and similar fine work. A 25-watt iron will not provide enough heat for large electrical connectors, joining copper roof flashing, or large stained-glass lead came. On the other hand, a 100-watt iron may provide too much heat for PCBs. Temperature-controlled irons have a reserve of power and can maintain temperature over a wide range of work.

A soldering gun heats a small cross-section copper tip very quickly by conducting a large AC current through it using a large cross-section one-turn transformer; the copper tip then conducts the heat to the part like other soldering irons. A soldering gun will be larger and heavier than a heating-element soldering iron of the same power rating because of the built-in transformer.

Gas-powered irons using a catalytic tip to heat a bit, without flame, are used for portable applications. Hot-air guns and pencils allow rework of component packages (such as surface mount devices) which cannot easily be performed with electric irons and guns.

For non-electronic applications, soldering torches use a flame rather than a soldering tip to heat solder. Soldering torches are often powered by butane and are available in sizes ranging from very small butane/oxygen units suitable for very fine but high-temperature jewelry work, to full-size oxy-fuel torches suitable for much larger work such as copper piping. Common multipurpose propane torches, the same kind used for heat-stripping paint and thawing pipes, can be used for soldering pipes and other fairly large objects either with or without a soldering tip attachment; pipes are generally soldered with a torch by directly applying the open flame.

A soldering copper is a tool with a large copper head and a long handle which is heated with a small direct flame and used to apply heat to sheet metal such as tin plated steel for soldering. Typical soldering coppers have heads weighing between one and four pounds. The head provides a large thermal mass to store enough heat for soldering large areas before needing re-heating in the fire; the larger the head, the longer the working time. The copper surface of the tool must be constantly cleaned and re-tinned during use. Historically, soldering coppers were standard tools used in auto bodywork, although body solder has been mostly superseded by spot welding for mechanical connection, and non-metallic fillers for contouring.

During WW2 and for some time afterwards SOE forces used small pyrotechnic self-soldering joints to make connections for the remote detonation of demolition and sabotage explosives. These consisted of a small copper tube partially filled with solder and a slow-burning pyrotechnic composition wrapped around the tube. The wires to be joined would be inserted into the tube and a small blob of ignition compound allowed the device to be struck like a match to ignite the pyrotechnic and heat the tube for long enough to melt the solder and make the joint.

=== Laser soldering ===
Laser soldering is a technique where a 30–50 W laser is used to melt and solder an electrical connection joint. Diode laser systems based on semiconductor junctions are used for this purpose. Suzanne Jenniches patented laser soldering in 1980.

Wavelengths are typically 808 nm through 980 nm. The beam is delivered via an optical fiber to the workpiece, with fiber diameters 800 μm and smaller. Since the beam out of the end of the fiber diverges rapidly, lenses are used to create a suitable spot size on the workpiece at a suitable working distance. A wire feeder is used to supply solder.

Both lead-tin and silver-tin material can be soldered. Process recipes will differ depending on the alloy composition. For soldering 44-pin chip carriers to a board using soldering preforms, power levels were on the order of 10 watts and solder times approximately 1 second. Low power levels can lead to incomplete wetting and the formation of voids, both of which can weaken the joint.

=== Photonic soldering ===
Photonic soldering of multiple chips on a PET substrate using SAC305 solder. Total time = 1.68 sec.

Photonic soldering is a relatively new process that uses broadband light from rapidly pulsing flashlamps to solder components to a circuit board. Energy consumption is approximately 85% less than that of a reflow oven, while the throughput is higher, and the footprint is smaller. It is similar to photonic curing, in that the components to be soldered are heated while the substrate remains relatively cool. This enables the use of high-temperature solders, such as SAC305, even on thermally fragile substrates such as PET, cellulose, and fabrics. An entire circuit board can be processed in a few seconds. In some cases, masks are used, but it can also be performed without registration, enabling very high processing rates.

=== Induction soldering ===
Induction soldering uses induction heating by high-frequency alternating current in a surrounding copper coil. This induces currents in the part being soldered, which generates heat because of the higher resistance of a joint versus its surrounding metal (resistive heating). These copper coils can be shaped to fit the joint more precisely. A filler metal (solder) is placed between the facing surfaces, and this solder melts at a fairly low temperature. Fluxes are commonly used in induction soldering. This technique is particularly suited to continuously soldering, in which case these coils wrap around a cylinder or a pipe that needs to be soldered.

=== Fiber focus infrared soldering ===
Fiber focus infrared soldering is technique where many infrared sources are led through fibers, then focused onto a single spot at which the connection is soldered.

=== Resistance soldering ===
Resistance soldering is soldering in which the heat required to melt the solder is created by passing an electric current through the parts to be soldered. When electric current is conducted through any metal, heat is generated; when that current is confined to a smaller cross-sectional area, the heat produced in the entire circuit is concentrated in the portion with the reduced cross-sectional area. The current doing the heating is applied by electrodes or tips energized from a low (open-circuit) voltage source, typically 2-7 volts. They can be tweezer-like for general connections or specially-shaped to make contact with parts located closely together.

Resistance soldering is unlike using a conduction iron, where heat is produced within an element and then passed through a thermally conductive tip into the joint area. A cold soldering iron requires time to reach working temperature and must be kept hot between solder joints. Thermal transfer may be inhibited if the tip is not kept properly wetted during use. With resistance soldering an intense heat can be rapidly developed directly within the joint area and in a tightly controlled manner. This allows a faster ramp up to the required solder melt temperature and minimizes thermal travel away from the solder joint, which helps to minimize the potential for thermal damage to materials or components in the surrounding area. Heat is only produced while each joint is being made, making resistance soldering more energy efficient. Because of these advantages, resistance soldering is common in industries which solder in small spaces such as connectors and wire terminals, and where high power is required, such as desoldering automotive parts.

Resistance soldering equipment, unlike conduction irons, can be used for difficult soldering and brazing applications where significantly higher temperatures may be required. This makes resistance comparable to flame soldering in some situations, but the resistance heat is more localized because of direct contact, whereas the flame might heat a larger area.

=== Active soldering ===
Flux-less soldering with aid of conventional soldering iron, ultrasonic soldering iron or specialized solder pot and active solder that contains an active element, most often titanium, zirconium or chromium. The active elements, owing to mechanical activation, react with the surface of the materials generally considered difficult to solder without premetallization. The active solders can be protected against excessive oxidation of their active element by addition of rare-earth elements with higher affinity to oxygen (typically cerium or lanthanum). Another common additive is gallium – usually introduced as a wetting promoter. Mechanical activation, needed for active soldering, can be performed by brushing (for example with use of stainless wire brush or steel spatula) or ultrasonic vibration (20–60 kHz). Active soldering has been shown to effectively bond ceramics, aluminium, titanium, silicon, graphite and carbon nanotube based structures at temperatures lower than 450 °C or use of protective atmosphere.

== Pipe soldering ==
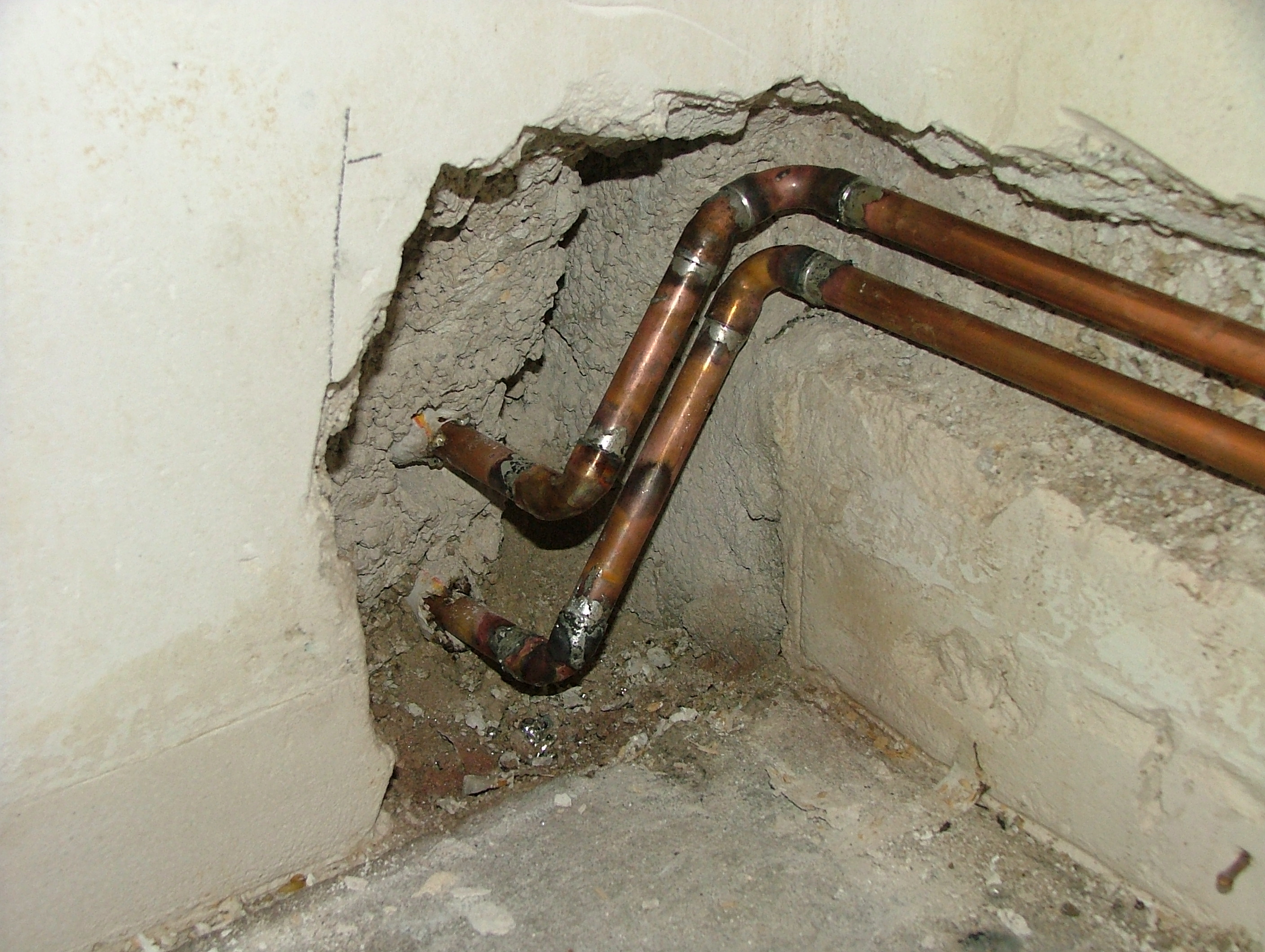
Soldered copper pipes

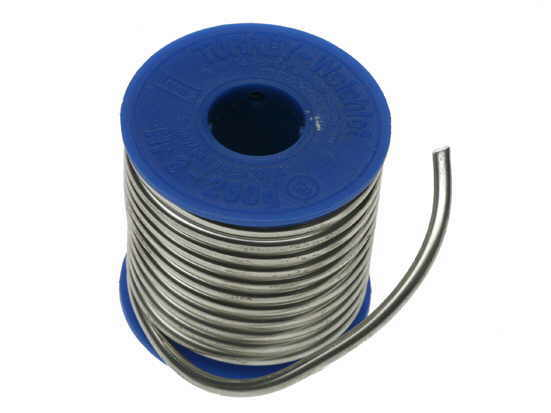
Solder

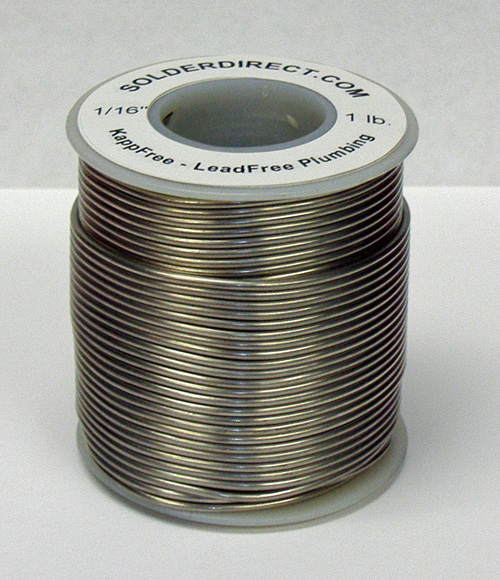
Lead-free solder

Copper pipe, or 'tube', is commonly joined by soldering. When applied in a plumbing trade context in the United States, soldering is often referred to as sweating, and a tubing connection so made is referred to as a sweated joint.

Outside the United States, "sweating" refers to the joining of flat metallic surfaces by a two step process by which solder is first applied to one surface, then this first piece is placed in position against the second surface and both are re-heated to achieve the desired joint.

Copper tubing conducts heat away much faster than a conventional hand-held soldering iron or gun can provide, so a propane torch is most commonly used to deliver the necessary power; for large tubing sizes and fittings a MAPP-fueled, acetylene-fueled, or propylene-fueled torch is used with atmospheric air as the oxidizer; MAPP/oxygen or acetylene/oxygen are rarely used because the flame temperature is much higher than the melting point of copper. Too much heat destroys the temper of hard-tempered copper tubing, and can burn the flux out of a joint before the solder is added, resulting in a faulty joint. For larger tubing sizes, a torch fitted with various sizes of interchangeable swirl tips is employed to deliver the needed heating power. In the hands of a skilled tradesman, the hotter flame of acetylene, MAPP, or propylene allows more joints to be completed per hour without damage to copper tempering.

However, it is possible to use an electrical tool to solder joints in copper pipe sized from 8 to 22 mm (3/8 to 7/8 in). For example, the Antex Pipemaster is recommended for use in tight spaces, when open flames are hazardous, or by do-it-yourself users. The pliers-like tool uses heated fitted jaws that completely encircle the pipe, allowing a joint to be melted in as little as 10 seconds.

Solder fittings, also known as 'capillary fittings', are usually used for copper joints. These fittings are short sections of smooth pipe designed to slide over the outside of the mating tube. Commonly used fittings include couplers, reducers, elbows, and tees. There are two types of solder fittings: 'end feed fittings' which contain no solder, and 'solder ring fittings' (also known as Yorkshire fittings), in which there is a ring of solder in a small circular recess inside the fitting.

As with all solder joints, all parts to be joined must be clean and oxide free. Internal and external wire brushes are available for the common pipe and fitting sizes; emery cloth and wire-wool are frequently used as well, although metal wool products are discouraged, as they can contain oil, which would contaminate the joint.

Because of the size of the parts involved, and the high activity and contaminating tendency of the flame, plumbing fluxes are typically much more chemically active, and often more acidic, than electronic fluxes. Because plumbing joints may be done at any angle, even upside down, plumbing fluxes are generally formulated as pastes which stay in place better than liquids. Flux is applied to all surfaces of the joint, inside and out. Flux residues are removed after the joint is complete to prevent erosion and failure of the joint.

Many plumbing solder formulations are available, with different characteristics, such as higher or lower melting temperature, depending on the specific requirements of the job. Building codes currently almost universally require the use of lead-free solder for drinking water piping (and also flux must be approved for drinking water applications), though traditional tin-lead solder is still available. Studies have shown that lead-soldered plumbing pipes can result in elevated levels of lead in drinking water.

Since copper pipe quickly conducts heat away from a joint, great care must be taken to ensure that the joint is properly heated through to obtain a good bond. After the joint is properly cleaned, fluxed and fitted, the torch flame is applied to the thickest part of the joint, typically the fitting with the pipe inside it, with the solder applied at the gap between the tube and the fitting. When all the parts are heated through, the solder will melt and flow into the joint by capillary action. The torch may need to be moved around the joint to ensure all areas are wetted out. However, the installer must take care to not overheat the areas being soldered. If the tube begins to discolor it means that the tube has been over-heated and is beginning to oxidize, stopping the flow of the solder and causing the soldered joint not to seal properly. Before oxidation the molten solder will follow the heat of the torch around the joint. When the joint is properly wetted out, the solder and then the heat are removed, and while the joint is still very hot, it is usually wiped with a dry rag. This removes excess solder as well as flux residue before it cools down and hardens. With a solder ring joint, the joint is heated until a ring of molten solder is visible around the edge of the fitting and allowed to cool.

Of the three methods of connecting copper tubing, solder connections require the most skill, but soldering copper is a very reliable process, provided some basic conditions are met:

- The tubing and fittings must be cleaned to bare metal with no tarnish
- Any pressure which is formed by heating of the tubing must have an outlet
- The joint must be dry (which can be challenging when repairing water pipes)

Copper is only one material that is joined in this manner. Brass fittings are often used for valves or as a connection fitting between copper and other metals. Brass piping is soldered in this manner in the making of brass instruments and some woodwind (saxophone and flute) musical instruments

Wire brush, wire wool and emery cloth are commonly used to prepare plumbing joints for connection. Bristle brushes are usually used to apply plumbing paste flux. A heavy rag is usually used to remove flux from a plumbing joint before it cools and hardens. A fiberglass brush can also be used.

When soldering pipes closely connected to valves such as in refrigeration systems it may be necessary to protect the valve from heat that could damage rubber or plastic components within, in this case a wet cloth wrapped around the valve can often sink sufficient heat through the boiling of the water to protect the valve.

=== Copper tube soldering defects ===
In the joining of copper tube, failure to properly heat and fill a joint may lead to a 'void' being formed. This is usually a result of improper placement of the flame. If the heat of the flame is not directed at the back of the fitting cup, and the solder wire applied degrees opposite the flame, then solder will quickly fill the opening of the fitting, trapping some flux inside the joint. This bubble of trapped flux is the void; an area inside a soldered joint where solder is unable to completely fill the fittings' cup, because flux has become sealed inside the joint, preventing solder from occupying that space.

== Stained glass soldering ==
Historically, stained glass soldering tips were copper, heated by being placed in a charcoal-burning brazier. Multiple tips were used; when one tip cooled down from use, it was placed back in the brazier of charcoal and the next tip was used. Solder used was typically composed of lead and tin.

More recently, electrically heated soldering irons are used. These are heated by a coil or ceramic heating element inside the tip of the iron. Different power ratings are available, and temperature can be controlled electronically. These characteristics allow longer beads to be run without interrupting the work to change tips. Soldering irons designed for electronic use are often effective though they are sometimes underpowered for the heavy copper and lead came used in stained glass work. Oleic acid is the classic flux material that has been used to improve solderability.

Tiffany-type stained glass is made by gluing copper foil around the edges of the pieces of glass and then soldering them together. This method makes it possible to create three-dimensional stained glass pieces.

== Electronics soldering ==
=== Hand soldering ===
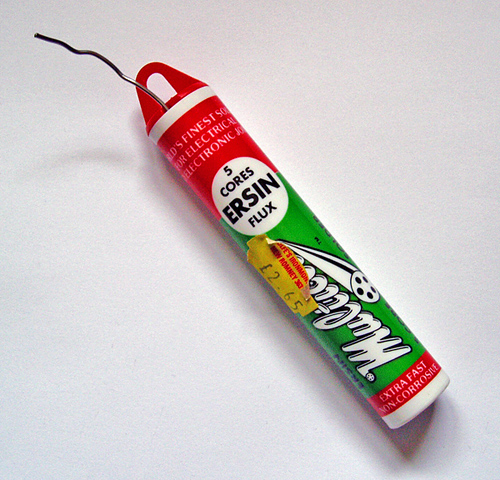
A tube of multicore electronics solder used for manual soldering

For attachment of electronic components to a PCB, proper selection and use of flux helps prevent oxidation during soldering; it is essential for good wetting and heat transfer. The soldering iron tip must be clean and pre-tinned with solder to ensure rapid heat transfer.

Electronic joints are usually made between surfaces that have been tinned and rarely require mechanical cleaning, though tarnished component leads and copper traces with a dark layer of oxide passivation (due to aging), as on a new prototyping board that has been on the shelf for about a year or more, may need to be mechanically cleaned.

To simplify soldering, beginners are usually advised to apply the soldering iron and the solder separately to the joint, rather than the solder being applied directly to the iron. When sufficient solder is applied, the solder wire is removed. When the surfaces are adequately heated, the solder will flow around the workpieces. The iron is then removed from the joint.

Unless all metal surfaces have been properly cleaned, fluxed, and brought above the melting temperature of the solder used, the result may be an unreliable ("cold solder") joint, even though its appearance may suggest otherwise. An unreliable joint may function for its intended purpose temporarily but will have a likelihood of failure.

Excess solder, unconsumed flux and residue is sometimes wiped from the soldering iron tip between joints. The tip of the bit (commonly iron plated to reduce erosion) is kept wetted with solder ("tinned") when hot to assist soldering, and to minimize oxidation and corrosion of the tip itself.

After inserting a through-hole mounted component, the excess lead is cut off, leaving a length of about the radius of the pad.

Hand-soldering techniques require a great deal of skill for the fine-pitch soldering of surface-mount chip packages. In particular, ball grid array (BGA) devices are notoriously difficult to rework by hand.

=== Defects ===
==== Cold joints ====
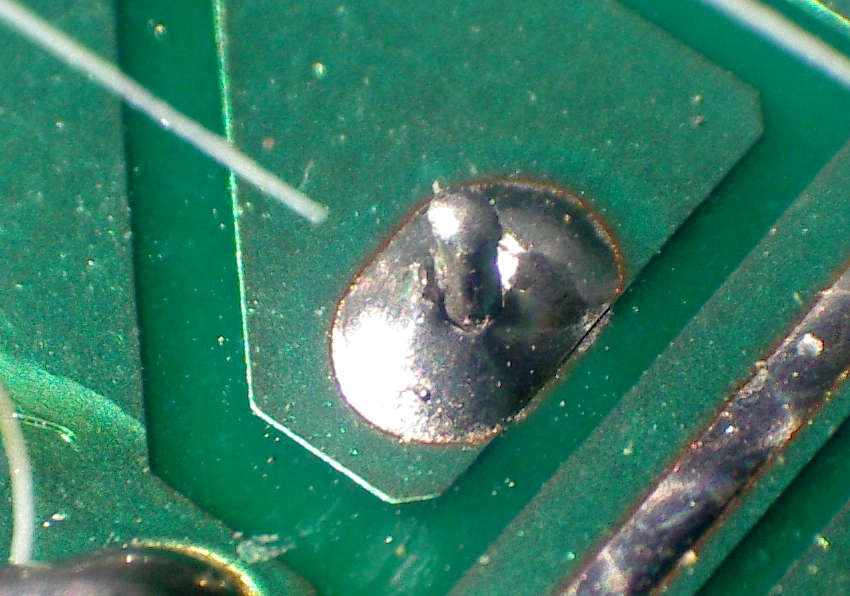
An improperly soldered 'cold' joint, where the wire was not sufficiently heated

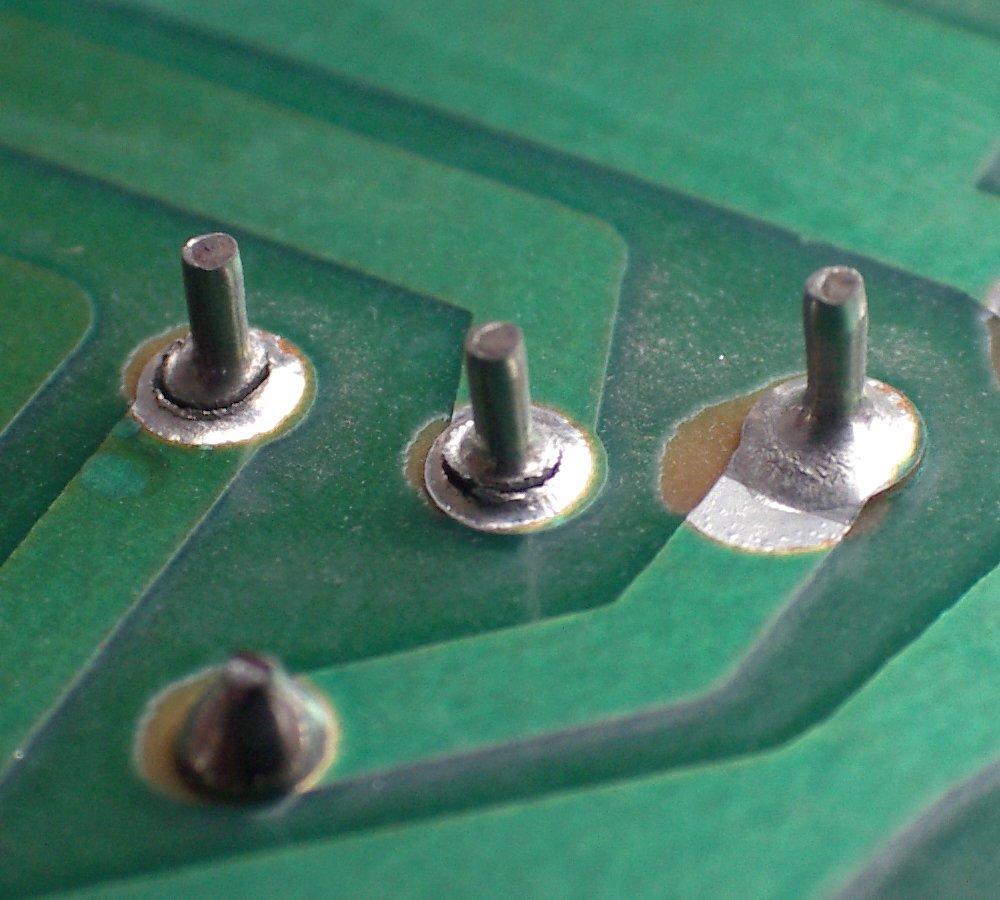
Broken solder joints on a circuit board. The joint on the right, although unbroken, has separated from the board.

Various problems may arise in the soldering process which lead to joints which are nonfunctional either immediately or after a period of use.

The most common defect when hand-soldering results from the parts being joined not exceeding the solder's liquidus temperature, resulting in a "cold solder" joint. This is usually the result of the soldering iron being used to heat the solder directly, rather than the parts themselves. Properly done, the iron heats the parts to be connected, which in turn melt the solder, guaranteeing adequate heat in the joined parts for thorough wetting. If using solder wire with an embedded flux core, heating the solder first may cause the flux to evaporate before it cleans the surfaces being soldered.

A cold-soldered joint may not conduct at all, or may conduct only intermittently. Cold-soldered joints also happen in mass production, and are a common cause of equipment which passes testing, but malfunctions after sometimes years of operation.

==== Dry joints ====
A "dry joint" occurs when the cooling solder is moved. Since non-eutectic solder alloys have a small plastic range, the joint must not be moved until the solder has cooled down through both the liquidus and solidus temperatures. Dry joints often occur because the joint moves when the soldering iron is removed from the joint. They are weak mechanically and poor conductors electrically.

=== Avoiding overheating of components ===
For hand soldering, the heat source tool is selected to provide adequate heat for the size of joint to be completed. A 100-watt soldering iron may provide too much heat for printed circuit boards (PCBs), while a 25-watt iron will not provide enough heat for large electrical connectors.

Using a tool with too high a temperature can damage sensitive components, but protracted heating by a tool that is too cool or under powered can also cause heat damage. Excessive heating of a PCB may result in delamination — the copper traces may actually lift off the substrate, particularly on single sided PCBs without through hole plating.

While hand-soldering, a heat sink, such as a crocodile clip, may be used on the leads of heat-sensitive components to reduce heat transfer to the components and avoid damaging them. This is especially applicable to germanium parts.

The heat sink limits the temperature of the component body by absorbing and dissipating heat, by reducing the thermal resistance between the component and the air. Meanwhile, the thermal resistance of the leads maintains the temperature difference between the part of the leads being soldered and the component body. Thus, the leads become hot enough to melt the solder while the component body remains cooler. The heat sink will mean the use of more heat to complete the joint, since heat taken up by the heat sink will not heat the work pieces.

Components which dissipate large amounts of heat during operation are sometimes elevated above the PCB to avoid PCB overheating. Plastic or metal mounting clips or holders may be used with large devices to aid heat dissipation and reduce joint stresses.

=== Visual inspection of joints ===
When visually inspected, a good solder joint will appear smooth, bright and shiny, with the outline of the soldered wire clearly visible. In general a good-looking soldered joint is a good joint.

A matte gray surface is a good indicator of a joint that was moved during soldering. A dry joint has a characteristically dull or grainy appearance immediately after the joint is made. This appearance is caused by crystallization of the liquid solder. Too little solder will result in a dry and unreliable joint.

Cold solder joints are dull and sometimes cracked or pock-marked. If the joint has lumps or balls of otherwise shiny solder, the metal has not wetted properly. Too much solder (the familiar 'solder blob' to beginners) is not necessarily unsound, but tends to mean poor wetting.

A concave fillet is ideal. The boundary between the solder and the workpiece in a good joint will have a low angle. This indicates good wetting and minimal use of solder, and therefore minimal heating of heat sensitive components. A joint may be good, but if a large amount of unnecessary solder is used, then excess heating was obviously required.

Lead-free solder formulations may cool to a dull surface even if the joint is good. The solder looks shiny while molten, and suddenly hazes over as it solidifies even though it has not been disturbed during cooling.

=== Flux use and residue ===
An improperly selected or applied flux can cause joint failure. Without flux the joint may not be clean, or may be oxidized, resulting in an unsound joint.

For electronic work, flux-core solder wire is generally used, but additional flux may be used from a flux pen or dispensed from a small bottle with a syringe-like needle.

Some fluxes are designed to be stable and inactive when cool and do not need to be cleaned off, though they can if desired. If such fluxes are used, cleaning may merely be a matter of aesthetics or to make visual inspection of joints easier in specialised 'mission critical' applications such as medical devices, military and aerospace. For satellites, this will also reduce weight, slightly but usefully. In high humidity, since even non-corrosive flux might remain slightly active, the flux may be removed to reduce corrosion over time.

Some fluxes are corrosive and flux residue must be removed after soldering. If not properly cleaned, the flux may corrode the joint or the PCB. Water, alcohol, acetone, or other solvents compatible with the flux and the parts involved are commonly used with cotton swabs or bristle brushes.

In some applications, the PCB might also be coated in some form of protective material such as a lacquer to protect it and exposed solder joints from the environment.

=== Desoldering and resoldering ===
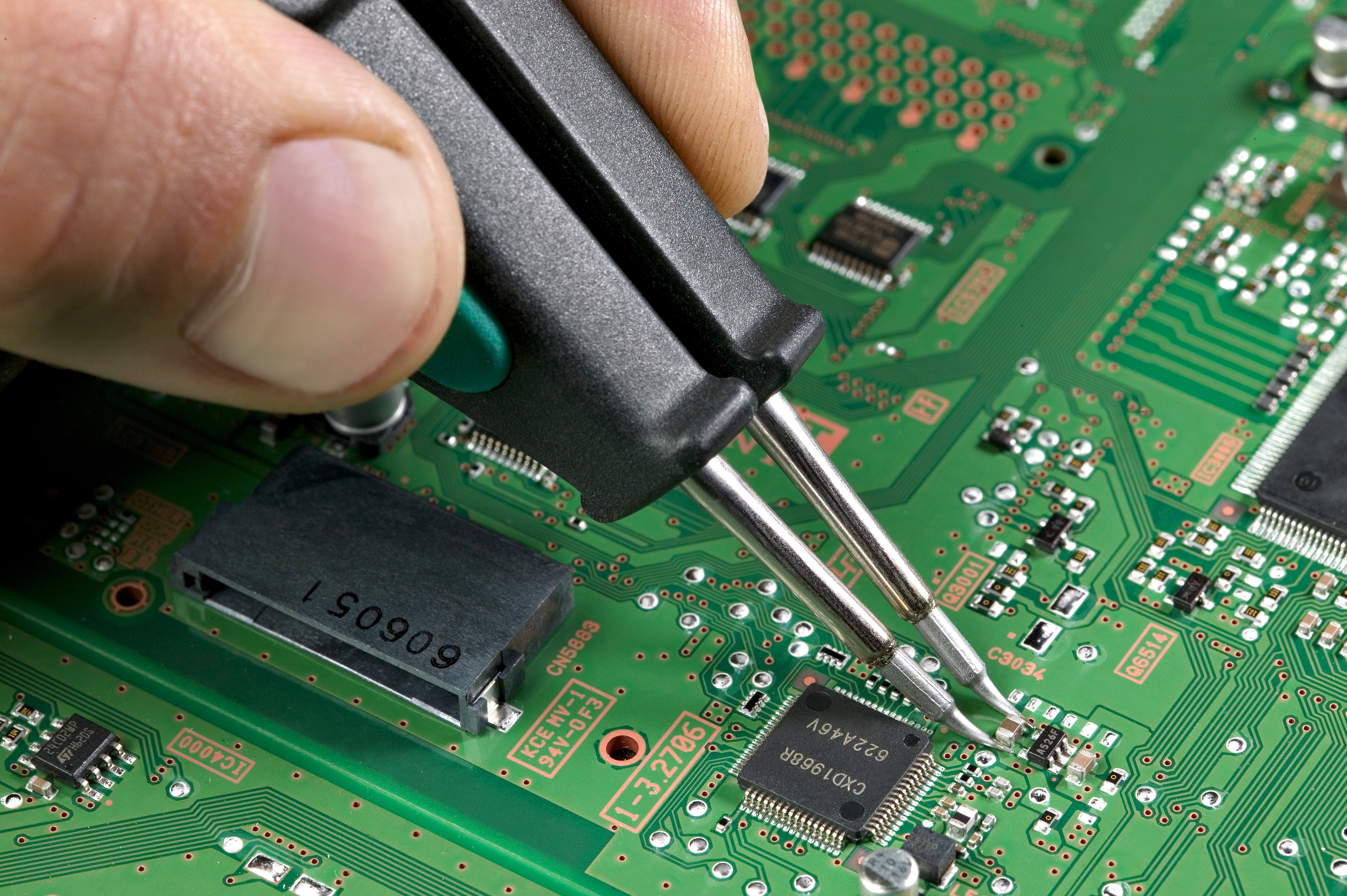
Desoldering of an SMD capacitor

Used solder contains some of the dissolved base metals and is unsuitable for reuse in making new joints. Once the solder's capacity for the base metal has been reached, it will no longer properly bond with the base metal, usually resulting in a brittle cold solder joint with a crystalline appearance.

It is good practice to remove solder from a joint prior to resoldering — desoldering braids (or wicks) or vacuum desoldering equipment (solder suckers) can be used. Desoldering wicks contain plenty of flux which will remove the oxidation from the copper trace and any device leads that are present. This will leave a bright, shiny, clean junction to be resoldered.

The lower melting point of solder means it can be melted away from the base metal, leaving it mostly intact, though the outer layer will be "tinned" with solder. Flux will remain which can easily be removed by abrasive or chemical processes. This tinned layer will allow solder to flow onto a new joint, resulting in a new joint, as well as making the new solder flow very quickly and easily.

=== Wave soldering and reflow soldering ===
Currently, mass-production printed circuit boards (PCBs) are mostly wave soldered or reflow soldered, though hand soldering of production electronics is also still widely used.

In wave soldering, components are prepped (trimmed or modified) and installed on the PCB. Sometimes, to prevent movement they are temporarily kept in place with small dabs of adhesive or secured with a fixture, then the assembly is passed over flowing solder in a bulk container. This solder flow is forced to produce a standing wave so the whole PCB is not submerged in solder, but rather just touched. The result is that solder stays on pins and pads, but not on the PCB itself.

Reflow soldering is a process in which a solder paste (a mixture of prealloyed solder powder and a flux-vehicle that has a peanut butter-like consistency) is used to stick the components to their attachment pads, after which the assembly is heated by an infrared lamp, a hot air pencil, or, more commonly, by passing it through a carefully controlled oven.

Since different components can be best assembled by different techniques, it is common to use two or more processes for a given PCB. For example, surface mounted parts may be reflow soldered first, with a wave soldering process for the through-hole mounted components coming next, and bulkier parts hand-soldered last.

==== Hot-bar reflow ====
Hot-bar reflow is a selective soldering process where two pre-fluxed, solder coated parts are heated with a heating element (called a thermode) to a temperature sufficient to melt the solder.

Pressure is applied through the entire process (usually 15 seconds) to ensure that components stay in place during cooling. The heating element is heated and cooled for each connection. Up to 4000 W can be used in the heating element, allowing fast soldering, good results with connections requiring high energy.

=== Environmental regulation and RoHS ===
Environmental legislation in many countries has led to a change in formulation of both solders and fluxes.

The RoHS directives in the European Community required many new electronic circuit boards to be lead-free by 1 July 2006, mostly in the consumer goods industry, but in some others as well. In Japan, manufacturers phased out lead prior to legislation due to the additional expense in recycling products containing lead.

Water-soluble non-rosin-based fluxes have been increasingly used since the 1980s so that soldered boards can be cleaned with water or water-based cleaners. This eliminates hazardous solvents from the production environment, and from factory effluents.

Even without the presence of lead, soldering can release fumes that are harmful and/or toxic to humans. It is highly recommended to use a device that can remove the fumes from the work area either by ventilating outside or filtering the air.

=== Lead-free ===
Lead-free soldering requires higher soldering temperatures than tin-lead soldering. For instance, while SnPb 63/37 eutectic solder melts at 183 °C, lead-free tin-silver-copper (SAC) solder melts at 217–220 °C. Nevertheless, many new technical challenges have arisen with this endeavor. To reduce the melting point of tin-based solder alloys, various new alloys have had to be researched, with additives of copper, silver, bismuth as typical minor additives to reduce the melting point and control other properties. Additionally, tin is a more corrosive metal, and can eventually lead to the failure of solder baths.

Lead-free construction has also extended to components, pins, and connectors. Most of these pins used copper frames, and either lead, tin, gold or other finishes. Tin finishes are the most popular of lead-free finishes. Nevertheless, this brings up the issue of how to deal with tin whiskers. The current movement brings the electronics industry back to the problems solved in the 1960s by adding lead. JEDEC has created a classification system to help lead-free electronic manufacturers decide what provisions to take against whiskers, depending upon their application.

== See also ==
- Dip soldering
- Electronics technician
- Solder fatigue
- Solder mask
