= Solder alloys =

Metallic material

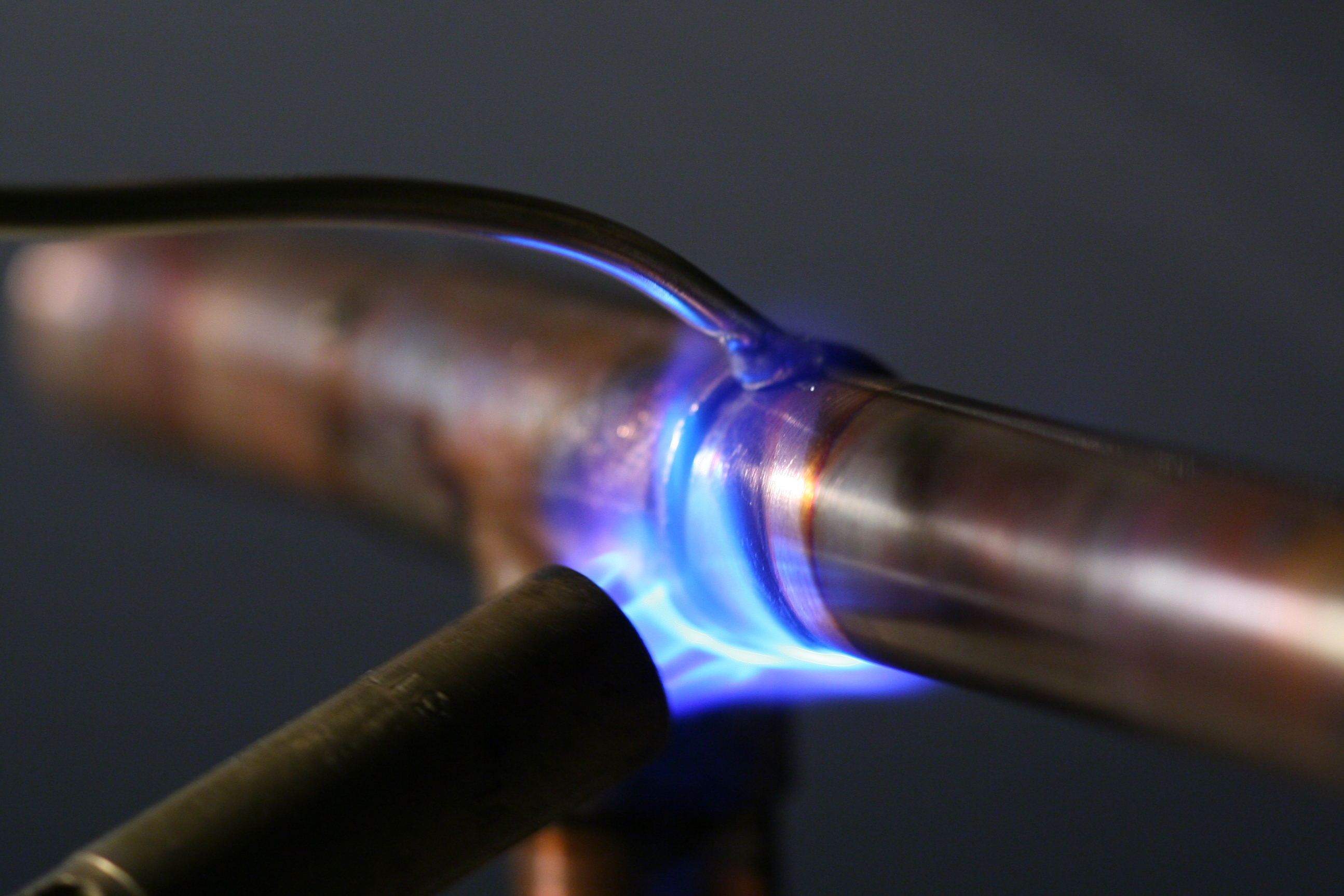
Soldering copper pipes using a propane torch and a lead-free solder

Solder is a metallic material that is used to connect metal workpieces. The choice of specific solder alloys depends on their melting point, chemical reactivity, mechanical properties, toxicity, and other properties. Hence a wide range of solder alloys exist, and only major ones are listed below. Since early 2000s the use of lead in solder alloys is discouraged by several governmental guidelines in the European Union, Japan and other countries, such as Restriction of Hazardous Substances Directive and Waste Electrical and Electronic Equipment Directive. Despite regulatory encouragement, the industry transition to lead-free solders has encountered technical challenges related to process compatibility, alloy reliability, and solder joint microstructure that have required extensive study and adaptation.

== Solder alloys ==
Note: the subscripts in the composition are mass percentages, not atom/molar ratios.

Composition	Melting point (°C)		Non-toxic	Eutectic	Comments
Composition	Solidus	Liquidus	Non-toxic	Eutectic	Comments
Bi_{100}	271		Yes	Pure	Used as a non-superconducting solder in low-temperature physics. Does not wet metals well, forms a mechanically weak joint.
In_{66.7}Bi_{33.3}	72.7				
In_{61.7}Bi_{30.8}Cd_{7.5}	62		Cd	Yes	
Bi_{56}Sn_{30}In_{14}	79	91		Yes	ChipQuik desoldering alloy, lead-free
In_{51.0}Bi_{32.5}Sn_{16.5}	60.5		Yes	Yes	Field's metal
Bi_{50.0}Pb_{25.0}Sn_{12.5}Cd_{12.5}	71		Cd, Pb	Near	Wood's metal, mostly used for casting.
Bi_{50}Pb_{26.7}Sn_{13.3}Cd_{10}	70		Cd, Pb	Yes	Cerrobend. Used in low-temperature physics as a solder.
Bi_{49.5}Pb_{27.3}Sn_{13.1}Cd_{10.1}	70.9		Cd, Pb	Near	Lipowitz Metal
Bi_{50.5}Pb_{27.8}Sn_{12.4}Cd_{9.3}	70	73	Cd, Pb	No	
Bi_{44.7}Pb_{22.6}In_{19.1}Cd_{5.3}Sn_{8.3}	47		Cd, Pb	Yes	Cerrolow 117. Used as a solder in low-temperature physics.
Bi_{49}Pb_{18}Sn_{12}In_{21}	58		Pb	Yes	Cerrolow 136. Slightly expands on cooling, later shows slight shrinkage in couple hours afterwards. Used as a solder in low-temperature physics. Also the ChipQuik desoldering alloy.
Bi_{49}Pb_{18}Sn_{15}In_{18}	58	69	Pb	No	
Bi_{48}Pb_{25.4}Sn_{12.8}Cd_{9.6}In_{4}	61	65	Cd, Pb	No	
Bi_{47.5}Pb_{25.4}Sn_{12.6}Cd_{9.5}In_{5}	57	65	Cd, Pb	No	
Bi_{58}Pb_{42}	124	126	Pb		
Bi_{57}Sn_{43}	139		Yes	Yes	Bi57. Reasonable shear strength and fatigue properties. Combination with lead-tin solder may dramatically lower melting point and lead to joint failure. Low-temperature eutectic solder with high strength. Particularly strong, very brittle. Used extensively in through-hole technology assemblies in IBM mainframe computers where low soldering temperature was required. Can be used as a coating of copper particles to facilitate their bonding under pressure/heat and creating a conductive metallurgical joint. Sensitive to shear rate. Good for electronics. Used in thermoelectric applications. Good thermal fatigue performance. Established history of use. Expands slightly on casting, then undergoes very low further shrinkage or expansion, unlike many other low-temperature alloys which continue changing dimensions for some hours after solidification. https://himikatus.ru/art/phase-diagr1/Bi-Sn.php confirms eutectic at 139 C
Bi_{52}Pb_{32}Sn_{16}	96		Pb	yes?	Bi52. Good fatigue resistance combined with low melting point. Reasonable shear strength and fatigue properties. Combination with lead-tin solder may dramatically lower melting point and lead to joint failure.
Bi_{50.0}Pb_{31.2}Sn_{18.8}	97		Pb	No	Newton's metal
Bi_{50}Pb_{28}Sn_{22}	109		Pb	No	Rose's metal. It was used to secure cast iron railings and balusters in pockets in stone bases and steps. Does not contract on cooling.
Bi_{46}Sn_{34}Pb_{20}	100	105	Pb	No	Bi46
Sn_{48}Bi_{32}Pb_{20}	140	160	Pb	No	For low-temperature soldering of heat-sensitive parts, and for soldering in the vicinity of already soldered joints without their remelting.
Sn_{43}Pb_{43}Bi_{14}	144	163	Pb	No	Bi14. Good fatigue resistance combined with low melting point. Contains phases of tin and lead-bismuth. Useful for step soldering.
Sn_{46}Pb_{46}Bi_{8}	120	167	Pb	No	Bi8
Sn_{89}Zn_{8}Bi_{3}	191	198	Yes		Prone to corrosion and oxidation due to its zinc content. On copper surfaces forms a brittle Cu-Zn intermetallic layer, reducing the fatigue resistance of the joint; nickel plating of copper inhibits this.
Sn_{86.5}Zn_{5.5}In_{4.5}Bi_{3.5}	174	186	Yes	No	Lead-free. Corrosion concerns and high drossing due to zinc content.
Bi_{57}Sn_{42}Ag_{1}	137; 139	139; 140	Yes		Addition of silver improves mechanical strength. Established history of use. Good thermal fatigue performance. Patented by Motorola.
Sn_{91.8}Bi_{4.8}Ag_{3.4}	211	213	Yes	No	Do not use on lead-containing metallizations.
Sn_{88}In_{8.0}Ag_{3.5}Bi_{0.5}	197	208	Yes		Patented by Matsushita/Panasonic.
Sn_{99.3}Cu_{0.7}Ni?Bi?	227			Yes	K100LD, a lead-free silver-free nickel-stabilized alloy, with low dissolving (LD) of copper. Proprietary to Kester. Similar to Sn99Cu1. The nickel content lowers copper erosion and promotes shiny solder fillet. Bismuth acts in synergy with nickel to further reduce copper dissolution and reduces surface tension. Performance similar to SAC alloys at lower cost. K100LDa has 0.2% copper, used to refill wave soldering pots to counteract copper buildup. Lower than optimal nickel content to avoid patents?
In_{74}Cd_{26}	123		Cd	Yes	
Pb_{92}Cd_{8}	310?		Cd, Pb	?	For soldering aluminium.
Cd_{70}Sn_{30}	140	160	Cd	No	Cd70, thermal-free solder. Produces low thermal EMF joints in copper, does not form parasitic thermocouples. Used in low-temperature physics.
Sn_{40}Pb_{42}Cd_{18}	145		Cd, Pb		Low melting temperature allows repairing pewter and zinc objects, including die-cast toys.
Sn_{50}Pb_{32}Cd_{18}	145		Cd, Pb		Cd18
Cd_{82.5}Zn_{17.5}	265		Cd	Yes	Medium temperature alloy that provide strong, corrosion-resistant joints on most metals. Also for soldering aluminium and die-cast zinc alloys. Used in cryogenic physics for attaching electrical potential leads to specimens of metals, as this alloy does not become superconductive at liquid helium temperatures.
Cd_{70}Zn_{30}	265	300	Cd	No	Medium temperature alloy that provide strong, corrosion-resistant joints on most metals. Works especially well on aluminium-to-aluminium and aluminium-to-copper joints, with excellent corrosion resistance and superior strength in high vibration and high stress applications in electronics, lighting and electrical products.
Cd_{60}Zn_{40}	265	316	Cd	No	Medium temperature alloy that provide strong, corrosion-resistant joints on most metals. Works especially well on aluminium-to-aluminium and aluminium-to-copper joints, with excellent corrosion resistance and superior strength in high vibration and high stress applications in electronics, lighting and electrical products.
Zn_{60}Cd_{40}	265	335	Cd		For soldering aluminium. Very good wetting.
Zn_{90}Cd_{10}	265	399	Cd		For soldering aluminium. Good wetting.
Sn_{40}Zn_{27}Cd_{33}	176	260	Cd	No	KappRad Developed specifically to join and repair aluminium and aluminium/copper radiators and heat exchangers. A lower melting point makes delicate repair work easier.
Cd_{95}Ag_{5}	338	393	Cd	No	KappTec General purpose solder that will join all solderable metals except aluminium. High temperature, high strength solder. It is used in applications where alloys melting higher than soft solders are required, but the cost and strength of silver-brazing alloys is not necessary.
Cd_{78}Zn_{17}Ag_{5}	249	316	Cd	No	KappTecZ High temperature, high strength solder that may be used on most metals, but works extremely well on aluminium, copper and stainless steel. It has a high tolerance to vibration and stress, and good elongation for use on dissimilar metals. Above its liquidus of 600 °F, this solder is extremely fluid and will penetrate the closest joints.
Sn_{51.2}Pb_{30.6}Cd_{18.2}	145		Cd, Pb	Yes	General-purpose. Maintains creep strength well. Unsuitable for gold.
In_{70}Sn_{15}Pb_{9.6}Cd_{5.4}	125		Cd, Pb		
In_{100}	157		Yes	Pure	In99. Used for die attachment of some chips. More suitable for soldering gold, dissolution rate of gold is 17 times slower than in tin-based solders and up to 20% of gold can be tolerated without significant embrittlement. Good performance at cryogenic temperatures. Wets many surfaces incl. quartz, glass, and many ceramics. Deforms indefinitely under load. Does not become brittle even at low temperatures. Used as a solder in low-temperature physics, will bond to aluminium. Can be used for soldering to thin metal films or glass with an ultrasonic soldering iron.
In_{75}Pb_{25}	156	165	Pb	No	Less gold dissolution and more ductile than lead-tin alloys. Used for die attachment, general circuit assembly and packaging closures.
In_{70}Pb_{30}	160; 165	174; 175	Pb	No	In70. Suitable for gold, low gold-leaching. Good thermal fatigue properties.
In_{60}Pb_{40}	174; 173	185; 181	Pb	No	In60. Low gold-leaching. Good thermal fatigue properties.
In_{50}Pb_{50}	180; 178	209; 210	Pb	No	In50. Only one phase. Resoldering with lead-tin solder forms indium-tin and indium-lead phases and leads to formation of cracks between the phases, joint weakening and failure. On gold surfaces gold-indium intermetallics tend to be formed, and the joint then fails in the gold-depleted zone and the gold-rich intermetallic. Less gold dissolution and more ductile than lead-tin alloys. Good thermal fatigue properties.
Pb_{60}In_{40}	195	225	Pb	No	In40. Low gold-leaching. Good thermal fatigue properties.
Pb_{70}In_{30}	245	260	Pb	No	In30
Pb_{75}In_{25}	250; 240	264; 260	Pb	No	In25. Low gold-leaching. Good thermal fatigue properties. Used for die attachment of e.g. GaAs dies. Used also for general circuit assembly and packaging closures. Less dissolution of gold and more ductile than tin-lead alloy.
Pb_{81}In_{19}	270; 260	280; 275	Pb	No	In19. Low gold-leaching. Good thermal fatigue properties.
In_{60}Sn_{40}	113	122	Yes	No	
In_{52}Sn_{48}	118		Yes	Yes	In52. Suitable for the cases where low-temperature soldering is needed. Can be used for glass sealing. Sharp melting point. Good wettability of glass, quartz, and many ceramics. Good low-temperature malleability, can compensate for different thermal expansion coefficients of joined materials.
In_{50}Sn_{50}	118	125	Yes	No	Cerroseal 35. Fairly well wets glass, quartz and many ceramics. Malleable, can compensate some thermal expansion differences. Low vapor pressure. Used in low temperature physics as a glass-wetting solder.
Sn_{52}In_{48}	118	131	Yes	No	very low tensile strength
Sn_{58}In_{42}	118	145	Yes	No	
Sn_{37.5}Pb_{37.5}In_{26}	134	181	Pb	No	In26
Sn_{37.5}Pb_{37.5}In_{25}	134	181	Pb	No	Good wettability. Not recommended for gold.
Sn_{54}Pb_{26}In_{20}	130; 140	154; 152	Pb	No	In20
Sn_{70}Pb_{18}In_{12}	162		Pb	Yes	General purpose. Good physical properties.
Sn_{70}Pb_{18}In_{12}	154	167	Pb	Yes	General purpose. Good physical properties.
In_{80}Pb_{15}Ag_{5}	142; 149	149; 154	Pb	No	In80. Compatible with gold, minimum gold-leaching. Resistant to thermal fatigue. Can be used in step soldering.
Pb_{92.5}In_{5}Ag_{2.5}	300	310	Pb	No	UNS L51510. Minimal leaching of gold, good thermal fatigue properties. Reducing atmosphere frequently used..
Pb_{90}In_{5}Ag_{5}	290	310	Pb	No	
Pb_{92.5}In_{5}Au_{2.5}	300	310	Pb	No	In5
Sn_{83.6}Zn_{7.6}In_{8.8}	181	187	Yes	No	High dross due to zinc.
Sn_{77.2}In_{20}Ag_{2.8}	175	187	Yes	No	Similar mechanical properties with Sn_{63}Pb_{37}, Sn_{62}Pb_{36}Ag_{2} and Sn_{60}Pb_{40}, suitable lead-free replacement. Contains eutectic Sn-In phase with melting point at 118 °C, avoid use above 100 °C.
Sn_{86.9}In_{10}Ag_{3.1}	204	205	Yes		Potential use in flip-chip assembly, no issues with tin-indium eutectic phase.
In_{97}Ag_{3}	143		Yes	Yes	Wettability and low-temperature malleability of indium, strength improved by addition of silver. Particularly good for cryogenic applications. Used for packaging of photonic devices.
In_{90}Ag_{10}	143	237	Yes	No	Nearly as wettable and low-temperature malleable as indium. Large plastic range. Can solder silver, fired glass and ceramics.
Au_{82}In_{18}	451	485	Yes	No	Au82. High-temperature, extremely hard, very stiff.
Pb_{90}Sn_{10}	268; 275	302; 302	Pb	No	Sn10, UNS L54520, ASTM10B. Balls for CBGA components, replaced by Sn_{95.5}Ag_{3.9}Cu_{0.6}. Low cost and good bonding properties. Rapidly dissolves gold and silver, not recommended for those. Used for fabrication of car radiators and fuel tanks, for coating and bonding of metals for moderate service temperatures. Body solder. Has low thermal EMF, can be used as an alternative to Cd_{70} where parasitic thermocouple voltage has to be avoided.
Pb_{88}Sn_{12}	254	296	Pb	No	Used for fabrication of car radiators and fuel tanks, for coating and bonding of metals for moderate service temperatures. Body solder.
Pb_{85}Sn_{15}	227	288	Pb	No	Used for coating tubes and sheets and fabrication of car radiators. Body solder.
Pb_{80}Sn_{20}	183	280	Pb	No	Sn20, UNS L54711. Used for coating radiator tubes for joining fins.
Pb_{75}Sn_{25}	183	266	Pb	No	Crude solder for construction plumbing works, flame-melted. Used for soldering car engine radiators. Used for machine, dip and hand soldering of plumbing fixtures and fittings. Superior body solder.
Pb_{70}Sn_{30}	185; 183	255; 257	Pb	No	Sn30, UNS L54280, crude solder for construction plumbing works, flame-melted, good for machine and torch soldering. Used for soldering car engine radiators. Used for machine, dip and hand soldering of plumbing fixtures and fittings. Superior body solder.
Pb_{68}Sn_{32}	253		Pb	No	"Plumber solder", for construction plumbing works
Pb_{67}Sn_{33}	187	230	Pb	No	PM 33, crude solder for construction plumbing works, flame-melted, temperature depends on additives
Pb_{65}Sn_{35}	183	250	Pb	No	Sn35. Used as a cheaper alternative of Pb_{60}Sn_{40} for wiping and sweating joints.
Pb_{60}Sn_{40}	183	238; 247	Pb	No	Sn40, UNS L54915. For soldering of brass and car radiators. For bulk soldering, and where wider melting point range is desired. For joining cables. For wiping and joining lead pipes. For repairs of radiators and electrical systems.
Pb_{55}Sn_{45}	183	227	Pb	No	For soldering radiator cores, roof seams, and for decorative joints.
Sn_{50}Pb_{50}	183	216; 212	Pb	No	Sn50, UNS L55030. "Ordinary solder", for soldering of brass, electricity meters, gas meters, formerly also tin cans. General purpose, for standard tinning and sheetmetal work. Becomes brittle below ?150 °C. Low cost and good bonding properties. Rapidly dissolves gold and silver, not recommended for those. For wiping and assembling plumbing joints for non-potable water.
Sn_{60}Pb_{40}	183	190; 188	Pb	Near	Sn60, ASTM60A, ASTM60B. Common in electronics, most popular leaded alloy for dipping. Low cost and good bonding properties. Used in both SMT and through-hole electronics. Rapidly dissolves gold and silver, not recommended for those. Slightly cheaper than Sn_{63}Pb_{37}, often used instead for cost reasons as the melting point difference is insignificant in practice. On slow cooling gives slightly duller joints than Sn_{63}Pb_{37}.
Sn_{62}Pb_{38}	183		Pb	Near	"Tinman's solder", used for tinplate fabrication work.
Sn_{63}Pb_{37}	183		Pb	Yes	Sn63, ASTM63A, ASTM63B. Common in electronics; exceptional tinning and wetting properties, also good for stainless steel. One of the most common solders. Low cost and good bonding properties. Used in both SMT and through-hole electronics. Rapidly dissolves gold and silver, not recommended for those. Sn_{60}Pb_{40} is slightly cheaper and is often used instead for cost reasons, as the melting point difference is insignificant in practice. On slow cooling gives slightly brighter joints than Sn_{60}Pb_{40}.
Sn_{70}Pb_{30}	183	193	Pb	No	Sn70
Sn_{75}Pb_{25}	183	238	Pb	No	
Sn_{90}Pb_{10}	183	213	Pb	No	formerly used for joints in food industry
Sn_{95}Pb_{5}	238		Pb	No	plumbing and heating
Pb_{63}Sn_{34}Zn_{3}	170	256	Pb	No	Poor wetting of aluminium. Poor corrosion rating.
Sn_{30}Pb_{50}Zn_{20}	177	288	Pb	No	Kapp GalvRepair Economical solder for repairing & joining most metals including aluminium and cast iron. Has been used for cast iron and galvanized surface repair.
Sn_{33}Pb_{40}Zn_{28}	230	275	Pb	No	Economical solder for repairing & joining most metals including aluminium and cast iron. Has been used for cast iron and galvanized surface repair.
Pb_{97.5}Ag_{1.5}Sn_{1}	309		Pb	Yes	Ag1.5, ASTM1.5S. High melting point, used for commutators, armatures, and initial solder joints where remelting when working on nearby joints is undesirable. Silver content reduces solubility of silver coatings in molten solder. Not recommended for gold. Standard PbAgSn eutectic solder, wide use in semiconductor assembly. Reducing protective atmosphere (e.g. 12% hydrogen) often used. High creep resistance, for use at both elevated and cryogenic temperatures.
Pb_{96}Sn_{2}Ag_{2}	252	295	Pb		Pb96
Pb_{95.5}Sn_{2}Ag_{2.5}	299	304	Pb	No	
Pb_{93.5}Sn_{5}Ag_{1.5}	296; 305	301; 306	Pb	No	Pb94, HMP alloy, HMP. Service temperatures up to 255 °C. Useful for step soldering. Also can be used for extremely low temperatures as it remains ductile down to −200 °C, while solders with more than 20% tin become brittle below −70 °C. Higher strength and better wetting than Pb_{95}Sn_{5}.
Pb_{92.5}Sn_{5}Ag_{2.5}	287; 299	296; 304	Pb	No	Pb93.
Pb_{92}Sn_{5.5}Ag_{2.5}	286	301	Pb	No	For higher-temperature applications.
Pb_{90}Sn_{5}Ag_{5}	292		Pb	Yes	
Pb_{88}Sn_{10}Ag_{2}	268; 267	290; 299	Pb	No	Sn10, Pb88. Silver content reduces solubility of silver coatings in the solder. Not recommended for gold. Forms a eutectic phase, not recommended for operation above 120 °C.
Pb_{80}Sn_{18}Ag_{2}	252	260	Pb	No	Used for soldering iron and steel
Pb_{54}Sn_{45}Ag_{1}	177	210	Pb		exceptional strength, silver gives it a bright long-lasting finish; ideal for stainless steel
Sn_{56}Pb_{39}Ag_{5}			Pb		
Sn_{62.5}Pb_{36}Ag_{2.5}	179		Pb	Yes	
Sn_{62}Pb_{36}Ag_{2}	179		Pb	Yes	Sn62. Common in electronics. The strongest tin-lead solder. Appearance identical to Sn_{60}Pb_{40} or Sn_{63}Pb_{37}. Crystals of Ag_{3}Sn may be seen growing from the solder. Extended heat treatment leads to formation of crystals of binary alloys. Silver content decreases solubility of silver, making the alloy suitable for soldering silver-metallized surfaces, e.g. SMD capacitors and other silver-metallized ceramics. Not recommended for gold. General-purpose.
Sn_{61}Pb_{36}Ag_{3}	205		Pb		Often referred as POS61 (Russian: ПОС61) in Russia (silver may not be necessarily present).
Sn_{97.5}Pb_{1}Ag_{1.5}	305		Pb	Yes	Important for hybrid circuits assembly.
Sn_{50}Pb_{48.5}Cu_{1.5}	183	215	Pb	No	Savbit, Savbit 1, Sav1. Minimizes dissolution of copper. Originally designed to reduce erosion of the soldering iron tips. About 100 times slower erosion of copper than ordinary tin/lead alloys. Suitable for soldering thin copper platings and very thin copper wires.
Sn_{60}Pb_{39}Cu_{1}			Pb	No	
Sn_{60}Pb_{38}Cu_{2}	183	190	Pb		Cu2. Copper content increases hardness of the alloy and inhibits dissolution of soldering iron tips and part leads in molten solder.
Sn_{62}Pb_{37}Cu_{1}	183		Pb	Yes	Similar to Sn_{63}Pb_{37}. Copper content increases hardness of the alloy and inhibits dissolution of soldering iron tips and part leads in molten solder.
Sn_{63}Pb_{37}P_{0.0015}-_{0.04}	183		Pb	Yes	Sn63PbP. A special alloy for HASL machines. Addition of phosphorus reduces oxidation. Unsuitable for wave soldering as it may form metal foam.
Pb_{80}Sn_{12}Sb_{8}			Pb	No	Used for soldering iron and steel
Pb_{80}Sb_{15}Sn_{5}	300		Pb		White Metal Capping. Used for locking mineshaft winding ropes into their tapered end sockets or 'capels'.
Pb_{79}Sn_{20}Sb_{1}	184	270	Pb	No	Sb1
Pb_{68}Sn_{30}Sb_{2}	185	243	Pb	No	Pb68
Pb_{63}Sn_{35}Sb_{2}	185	243	Pb	No	Sb2
Pb_{55}Sn_{43.5}Sb_{1.5}			Pb	No	General purpose solder. Antimony content improves mechanical properties but causes brittleness when soldering cadmium, zinc, or galvanized metals.
Pb_{97.5}Ag_{2.5}	303; 304		Pb	Yes	Ag2.5, UNS L50132. Used during World War II to conserve tin. Poor corrosion resistance; joints suffered corrosion in both atmospheric and underground conditions, all had to be replaced with Sn-Pb alloy joints. Torch solder.
Pb_{97.5}Ag_{2.5}	304	579	Pb	Yes	Ag2.5, UNS L50132. Used during World War II to conserve tin. Poor corrosion resistance; joints suffered corrosion in both atmospheric and underground conditions, all had to be replaced with Sn-Pb alloy joints. Torch solder.
Pb_{96}Ag_{4}	305		Pb		high-temperature joints
Pb_{95}Ag_{5}	305	364	Pb	No	
Pb_{94.5}Ag_{5.5}	305; 304	364; 343	Pb	No	Ag5.5, UNS L50180
Sn	232		Yes	Pure	Pure tin is susceptible to tin pest. Alloys with 99% tin are generally referred to as Sn99. They include elements that retard tin pest. Good strength, non-dulling. Use in food processing equipment, wire tinning, and alloying.
Sn_{98}Ag_{2}			Yes		
Sn_{96.5}Ag_{3.5}	221		Yes	Yes	Sn_{96}, Sn_{96.5}, 96S. Fine lamellar structure of densely distributed Ag_{3}Sn. Annealing at 125 °C coarsens the structure and softens the solder. Creeps via dislocation climb as a result of lattice diffusion. Used as wire for hand soldering rework; compatible with SnCu_{0.7}, SnAg_{3}Cu_{0.5}, SnAg_{3.9}Cu_{0.6}, and similar alloys. Used as solder spheres for BGA/CSP components. Used for step soldering and die attachment in high power devices. Established history in the industry. Widely used. Strong lead-free joints. Silver content minimizes solubility of silver coatings. Not recommended for gold. Marginal wetting. Good for step soldering. Used for soldering stainless steel as it wets stainless steel better than other soft solders. Silver content does not suppress dissolution of silver metallizations. High tin content allows absorbing significant amount of gold without embrittlement.
Sn_{96}Ag_{4}	221	229	Yes	No	ASTM96TS. "Silver-bearing solder". Food service equipment, refrigeration, heating, air conditioning, plumbing. Widely used. Strong lead-free joints. Silver content minimizes solubility of silver coatings. Not recommended for gold.
Sn_{95}Ag_{5}	221	254	Yes	No	Widely used. Strong lead-free joints. Silver content minimizes solubility of silver coatings. Not recommended for gold. Produces strong and ductile joints on Copper and Stainless Steel. The resulting joints have high tolerance to vibration and stress, with tensile strengths to 30,000 psi on Stainless.
Sn_{94}Ag_{6}	221	279	Yes	No	Produces strong and ductile joints on copper and stainless steel. The resulting joints have high tolerance to vibration and stress, with tensile strengths to 30,000 psi on sStainless.
Sn_{93}Ag_{7}	221	302	Yes	No	Produces strong and ductile joints on copper and stainless steel. The resulting joints have high tolerance to vibration and stress, with tensile strengths to 31,000 psi on stainless. Audio industry standard for vehicle and home theater speaker installations. Its 7% silver content requires a higher temperature range, but yields superior strength and vibration resistance.
Sn_{90}Au_{10}	217		Yes	Yes	
Au_{80}Sn_{20}	280		Yes	Yes	Au80. Good wetting, high strength, low creep, high corrosion resistance, high thermal conductivity, high surface tension, zero wetting angle. Suitable for step soldering. The original flux-less alloy, does not need flux. Used for die attachment and attachment of metal lids to semiconductor packages, e.g. kovar lids to ceramic chip carriers. Coefficient of expansion matching many common materials. Due to zero wetting angle requires pressure to form a void-free joint. Alloy of choice for joining gold-plated and gold-alloy plated surfaces. As some gold dissolves from the surfaces during soldering and moves the composition to non-eutectic state (1% increase of Au content can increase melting point by 30 °C), subsequent desoldering requires higher temperature. Forms a mixture of two brittle intermetallic phases, AuSn and Au_{5}Sn. Brittle. Proper wetting achieved usually by using nickel surfaces with gold layer on top on both sides of the joint. Comprehensively tested through military standard environmental conditioning. Good long-term electrical performance, history of reliability. One of the best materials for soldering in optoelectronic devices and components packaging. Low vapor pressure, suitable for vacuum work. Generally used in applications that require a melting temperature over 150 °C. Good ductility. Also classified as a braze.
Sn_{99.3}Cu_{0.7}	228		Yes	Yes	Sn99Cu1. Also designated as Sn_{99}Cu_{1}. Cheap alternative for wave soldering, recommended by the US NEMI consortium. Coarse microstructure with ductile fractures. Sparsely distributed Cu_{6}Sn_{5}. Forms large dendritic ß-tin crystals in a network of eutectic microstructure with finely dispersed Cu_{6}Sn_{5}. High melting point unfavorable for SMT use. Low strength, high ductility. Susceptible to tin pest. Addition of small amount of nickel increases its fluidity; the highest increase occurs at 0.06% Ni. Such alloys are known as nickel modified or nickel stabilized.
Sn_{97}Cu_{3}	227; 232	250; 332	Yes		For high-temperature uses. Allows removing insulation from an enameled wire and applying solder coating in a single operation. For radiator repairs, stained glass windows, and potable water plumbing.
Sn_{99}Cu_{0.7}Ag_{0.3}	217	228	Yes	No	SCA, SAC, or SnAgCu. Tin-silver-copper alloy. Relatively low-cost lead-free alloy for simple applications. Can be used for wave, selective and dip soldering. At high temperatures tends to dissolve copper; copper buildup in the bath has detrimental effect (e.g. increased bridging). Copper content must be maintained between 0.4–0.85%, e.g. by refilling the bath with Sn_{96.2}Ag_{3.8} alloy (designated e.g. SN96Ce). Nitrogen atmosphere can be used to reduce losses by dross formation. Dull, surface shows formation of dendritic tin crystals.
Sn_{99}Ag_{0.3}Cu_{0.7}			Yes		
Sn_{98.5}Ag_{1.0}Cu_{0.5}	220	225	Yes	Near	SAC105 alloy contains the least amount of silver among lead-free solders. It is compatible with all flux types and is relatively inexpensive; it exhibits good fatigue resistance, wetting and solder joint reliability
Sn_{97}Cu_{2.75}Ag_{0.25}	228	314	Yes		High hardness, creep-resistant. For radiators, stained glass windows, and potable water plumbing. Excellent high-strength solder for radiator repairs. Wide range of patina and colors.
Sn_{96.5}Ag_{3.0}Cu_{0.5}	217	220; 218	Yes	Near	SAC305. It is the JEITA recommended alloy for wave and reflow soldering, with alternatives SnCu for wave and SnAg and SnZnBi for reflow soldering. Usable also for selective soldering and dip soldering. At high temperatures tends to dissolve copper; copper buildup in the bath has detrimental effect (e.g. increased bridging). Copper content must be maintained between 0.4–0.85%, e.g. by refilling the bath with Sn_{97}Ag_{3} alloy. Nitrogen atmosphere can be used to reduce losses by dross formation. Dull, surface shows formation of dendritic tin crystals. Weakens at thermal cycling, concern of whisker growth, large Ag_{3}Sn intermetallic platelet precipitates causing mechanical weakening and poor shock/drop performance. Tendency to creep.
Sn_{95.8}Ag_{3.5}Cu_{0.7}	217	218	Yes	Near	SN96C-Ag3.5 A commonly used alloy. Used for wave soldering. Usable also for selective soldering and dip soldering. At high temperatures tends to dissolve copper; copper buildup in the bath has detrimental effect (e.g. increased bridging). Copper content must be maintained between 0.4–0.85%, e.g. by refilling the bath with Sn_{96.5}Ag_{3.5} alloy (designated e.g. SN_{96}Ce). Nitrogen atmosphere can be used to reduce losses by dross formation. Dull, surface shows formation of dendritic tin crystals.
Sn_{95.6}Ag_{3.5}Cu_{0.9}	217		Yes	Yes	Determined by NIST to be truly eutectic.
Sn_{95.5}Ag_{4}Cu_{0.5}	217		Yes	Yes	SAC405. Lead-Free, Cadmium free formulation designed specifically to replace lead solders in copper and stainless steel plumbing, and in electrical and electronic applications.
Sn_{95.5}Ag_{3.9}Cu_{0.6}	217		Yes	Yes	Recommended by the US NEMI consortium for reflow soldering. Used as balls for BGA/CSP and CBGA components, a replacement for Sn_{10}Pb_{90}. Solder paste for rework of BGA boards. Alloy of choice for general SMT assembly.
Sn_{95.5}Ag_{3.8}Cu_{0.7}	217		Yes	Near	SN96C. Preferred by the European IDEALS consortium for reflow soldering. Usable also for selective soldering and dip soldering. At high temperatures tends to dissolve copper; copper buildup in the bath has detrimental effect (e.g. increased bridging). Copper content must be maintained between 0.4–0.85%, e.g. by refilling the bath with Sn_{96.2}Ag_{3.8} alloy (designated e.g. SN96Ce). Nitrogen atmosphere can be used to reduce losses by dross formation. Dull, surface shows formation of dendritic tin crystals.
Sn_{95.5}Cu_{4}Ag_{0.5}	226	260	Yes	No	KappFree provides good joint strength, vibration resistance, and thermal cycle fatigue resistance in both piping and electrical products as opposed to tin-lead solders. Higher working temperature. Wets well to brass, copper, and stainless steel. Good electrical conductivity.
Sn_{95}Ag_{4}Cu_{1}			Yes		
Sn_{90.7}Ag_{3.6}Cu_{0.7}Cr_{5}	217	1050	Yes	No	C-Solder. Lead-free, low-temperature soldering alloy for joining of various carbon materials including carbon fibres and carbon nanotube fibres in both carbon-carbon and carbon-metal arrangements. Produces mechanically strong and electrically conductive bonds. Provides wetting of carbon and other materials generally considered as difficult to solder, including aluminium, stainless steel, titanium, glass, and ceramics.
Sn_{65}Ag_{25}Sb_{10}	233		Yes	Yes	Very high tensile strength. For die attachment. Very brittle. Old Motorola die attach solder.
Sn_{96.2}Ag_{2.5}Cu_{0.8}Sb_{0.5}	217	225	Yes		Ag03A. Patented by AIM alliance.
Sn_{95.25}Ag_{3.8}Cu_{0.7}Sb_{0.25}			Yes		Preferred by the European IDEALS consortium for wave soldering.
Sn_{99.3}Cu_{0.7}Ni_{0.05}Ge_{0.009}	227			Yes	Sn100C, a lead-free silver-free nickel-stabilized alloy. Similar to Sn99Cu1. The nickel content lowers copper erosion and promotes shiny solder fillet. The presence of germanium promotes flow and reduces dross formation. Performance similar to SAC alloys at lower cost. Dross formation rate comparable to lead-tin alloys.
Sn_{99}Sb_{1}	232	235	Yes	No	
Sn_{97}Sb_{3}	232	238	Yes	No	
Sn_{95}Sb_{5}	235; 232	240	Yes	No	Sb5, ASTM95TA. The US plumbing industry standard. It displays good resistance to thermal fatigue and good shear strength. Forms coarse dendrites of tin-rich solid solution with SbSn intermetallic dispersed between. Very high room-temperature ductility. Creeps via viscous glide of dislocations by pipe diffusion. More creep-resistant than SnAg_{3.5}. Antimony can be toxic. Used for sealing chip packagings, attaching I/O pins to ceramic substrates, and die attachment; a possible lower-temperature replacement of AuSn. High strength and bright finish. Use in air conditioning, refrigeration, some food containers, and high-temperature applications. Good wettability, good long-term shear strength at 100 °C. Suitable for potable water systems. Used for stained glass, plumbing, and radiator repairs.
Sn_{91}Zn_{9}	199		Yes	Yes	KappAloy9 Designed specifically for aluminium-to-aluminium and aluminium-to-copper soldering. It has good corrosion resistance and tensile strength. Lies between soft solder and silver brazing alloys, thereby avoiding damage to critical electronics and substrate deformation and segregation. Best solder for aluminium wire to Copper busses or copper wire to aluminium busses or contacts. UNS#: L91090
Sn_{85}Zn_{15}	199	260	Yes	No	KappAloy15 Designed specifically for aluminium-to-aluminium and aluminium-to-copper soldering. It has good corrosion resistance and tensile strength. Lies between soft solder and silver brazing alloys, thereby avoiding damage to critical electronics and substrate deformation and segregation. Has a wide plastic range this makes it ideal for hand soldering aluminium plates and parts, allowing manipulation of the parts as the solder cools.
Sn_{80}Zn_{20}	199	288	Yes	No	KappAloy20 For soldering of aluminium. Good wetting. Used extensively in spray wire form for capacitors and other electronic parts. Higher temperature and higher tensile strength compared to 85Sn/15Zn and 91Sn/9Zn.
Sn_{70}Zn_{30}	199	316	Yes	No	KappAloy30 For soldering of aluminium. Good wetting. Used extensively in spray wire form for capacitors and other
Sn_{60}Zn_{40}	199	343	Yes	No	KappAloy40 For soldering of aluminium. Good wetting. Used extensively in spray wire form for capacitors and other electronic parts. Higher temperature and higher tensile strength compared to 85Sn/15Zn and 91Sn/9Zn.electronic parts. Higher temperature and higher tensile strength compared to 85Sn/15Zn and 91Sn/9Zn.
Zn_{60}Sn_{40}	199	341	Yes	No	For soldering aluminium. Good wetting.
Zn_{70}Sn_{30}	199	376	Yes	No	For soldering aluminium. Excellent wetting. Good strength.
Zn_{95}Sn_{5}	382		Yes	yes?	For soldering aluminium. Excellent wetting.
Sn_{90}Zn_{7}Cu_{3}	200	222	Yes	No	Kapp Eco-Babbitt Commonly used in capacitor manufacturing as protective coating to shield against electromotive force (EMF) and electromagnetic interference (EMI) with the specified performance of the capacitor, to prevent current and charge leakage out of and within the layers of the capacitor, and to prevent the development of electron flows within the coating material itself, that would diminish capacitor performance, coating, and capacitor life.
Sn_{50}Zn_{49}Cu_{1}	200	300	Yes	No	Galvanite Lead-free galvanizing solder formulation designed specifically for high quality repairs to galvanized steel surfaces. Simple, effective and easy to use, in both manufacturing and field applications. Metallurgically bonds to the steel, for a seamless protective barrier.
Sn_{95}Ag_{3.5}Zn_{1}Cu_{0.5}		221	Yes	No	
Zn_{100}	419		Yes	Pure	For soldering aluminium. Good wettability of aluminium, relatively good corrosion resistance.
Zn_{95}Al_{5}	382		Yes	Yes	For soldering aluminium. Good wetting.
Au_{87.5}Ge_{12.5}	361; 356		Yes	Yes	Au88. Used for die attachment of some chips. The high temperature may be detrimental to the chips and limits reworkability.
Au_{98}Si_{2}	370	800	Yes		Au98. A non-eutectic alloy used for die attachment of silicon dies. Ultrasonic assistance is needed to scrub the chip surface so a eutectic (3.1% Si) is reached at reflow.
Au_{96.8}Si_{3.2}	370	363	Yes	Yes	Au97. AuSi_{3.2} is a eutectic with melting point of 363 °C. AuSi forms a meniscus at the edge of the chip, unlike AuSn, as AuSi reacts with the chip surface. Forms a composite material structure of submicron silicon plates in soft gold matrix. Tough, slow crack propagation.

=== Notes on the above table ===
In the Sn-Pb alloys, tensile strength increases with increasing tin content. Indium-tin alloys with high indium content have very low tensile strength.

For soldering semiconductor materials, e.g. die attachment of silicon, germanium and gallium arsenide, it is important that the solder contains no impurities that could cause doping in the wrong direction. For soldering n-type semiconductors, solder may be doped with antimony (group V); indium (group III) may be added for soldering p-type semiconductors. Most semiconductor solders in practical use are made wholly of elements without a doping effect such as Ph, Sn, Ag, Au, Cu. The use of tin-based lead-free solder carries risks of tin whisker, and intermetallic compound growth (tin pest is however not a common issue due to alloying).

Various fusible alloys can be used as solders with very low melting points; examples include Field's metal (In_{51}Bi_{31.5}Sn_{16.5}), Lipowitz's alloy, Wood's metal (Bi_{50}Pb_{26.7}Sn_{13.3}Cd_{10}), and Rose's metal (Bi_{50}Pb_{50}Sn_{50}).

=== Properties ===
The thermal conductivity of common solders ranges from 30 to 400 W/(m·K), and the density from 9.25 to 15.00 g/cm^{3}.

Material	Thermal conductivity (W/m·K)	Melting point (°C)
Sn-37Pb (eutectic)	50.9	183
Sn-0.7Cu	53	227
Sn-2.8Ag-20.0In	53.5	175–186
Sn-2.5Ag-0.8Cu-0.5Sb	57.26	215–217
Pb-5Sn	63	310
Lead (Pb)	35.0	327.3
Tin (Sn)	73.0	231.9
Aluminium (Al)	240	660.1
Copper (Cu)	393–401	1083
FR-4	1.7	
