= Cerrosafe =

Fusible alloy with a low melting point

Cerrosafe is a fusible alloy with a low melting point. It is a non-eutectic mixture consisting of 42.5% bismuth, 37.7% lead, 11.3% tin, and 8.5% cadmium that melts between 70 °C (158 °F) and 88 °C (190 °F). It is useful for making reference castings whose dimensions can be correlated to those of the mold or other template due to its well-known thermal expansion properties during cooling. The alloy contracts during the first 30 minutes, allowing easy removal from a mold, then expands during the next 30 minutes to return to the exact original size. It then continues expanding at a known rate for 200 hours, allowing conversion of measurements of the casting back to those of the mold.

== Similar metals ==
Alloy	Melting point	Eutectic?	Bismuth %	Lead %	Tin %	Indium %	Cadmium %	Thallium %	Gallium %	Antimony %
Rose's metal	98 °C (208 °F)	No	50	25	25	—N/a	—N/a	—N/a	—N/a	—N/a
Cerrosafe	74 °C (165 °F)	No	42.5	37.7	11.3	—N/a	8.5	—N/a	—N/a	—N/a
Wood's metal	70 °C (158 °F)	Yes	50	26.7	13.3	—N/a	10	—N/a	—N/a	—N/a
Field's metal	62 °C (144 °F)	Yes	32.5	—N/a	16.5	51	—N/a	—N/a	—N/a	—N/a
Cerrolow 136	58 °C (136 °F)	Yes	49	18	12	21	—N/a	—N/a	—N/a	—N/a
Cerrolow 117	47.2 °C (117 °F)	Yes	44.7	22.6	8.3	19.1	5.3	—N/a	—N/a	—N/a
Bi-Pb-Sn-Cd-In-Tl	41.5 °C (107 °F)	Yes	40.3	22.2	10.7	17.7	8.1	1.1	—N/a	—N/a
Gallium	29.8 °C (86 °F)	Pure metal	—N/a	—N/a	—N/a	—N/a	—N/a	—N/a	100	—N/a
Galinstan	−19 °C (−2 °F)	No	<1.5	—N/a	9.5–10.5	21–22	—N/a	—N/a	68–69	<1.5
