= Liquid metal =

Metal or alloy that is liquid at room temperature

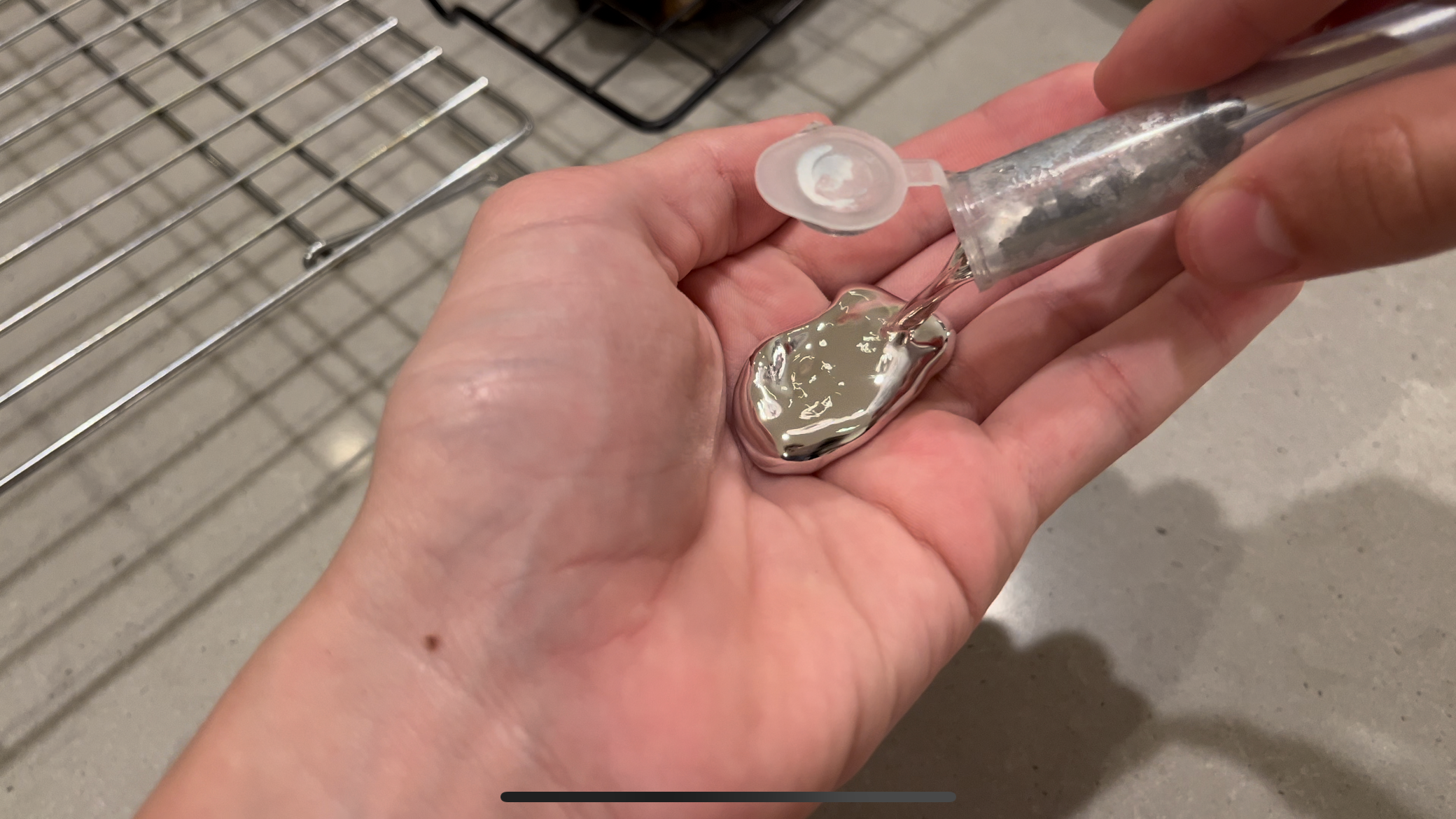
Liquid gallium metal, at 30°C (86°F).

A liquid metal is a metal or a metal alloy which is liquid at or near room temperature.

The only stable liquid elemental metal at room temperature is mercury (Hg), which is molten above −38.8 °C (234.3 K, −37.9 °F). Three more stable elemental metals melt just above room temperature: caesium (Cs), which has a melting point of 28.5 °C (83.3 °F); gallium (Ga) (30 °C [86 °F]); and rubidium (Rb) (39 °C [102 °F]). The radioactive metal francium (Fr) is probably liquid close to room temperature as well. Calculations predict that the radioactive metals copernicium (Cn) and flerovium (Fl) should also be liquid at room temperature.

Alloys can be liquid if they form a eutectic, meaning that the alloy's melting point is lower than any of the alloy's constituent metals. The standard metal for creating liquid alloys used to be mercury, but gallium-based alloys, which are lower both in their vapor pressure at room temperature and toxicity, are being used as a replacement in various applications.

== Thermal and electrical conductivity ==
Alloy systems that are liquid at room temperature have thermal conductivity far superior to ordinary non-metallic liquids, allowing liquid metal to efficiently transfer energy from the heat source to the liquid. They also have a higher electrical conductivity that allows the liquid to be pumped more efficiently, by electromagnetic pumps. This results in the use of these materials for specific heat conducting and/or dissipation applications.

Another advantage of liquid alloy systems is their inherent high densities.

== Viscosity ==
The viscosity of liquid metals can vary greatly depending on the atomic composition of the liquid, especially in the case of alloys. In particular, the temperature dependence of the viscosity of liquid metals may range from the standard Arrhenius law dependence, to a much steeper (non-Arrhenius) dependence such as that given empirically by the Vogel–Fulcher–Tammann equation. A physical model for the viscosity of liquid metals, which captures this great variability in terms of the underlying interatomic interactions, was also developed.

The electrical resistance of a liquid metal can be estimated by means of the Ziman formula, which gives the resistance in terms of the static structure factor of the liquid as can be determined by neutron or X-ray scattering measurements.

== Wetting to metallic and non-metallic surfaces ==
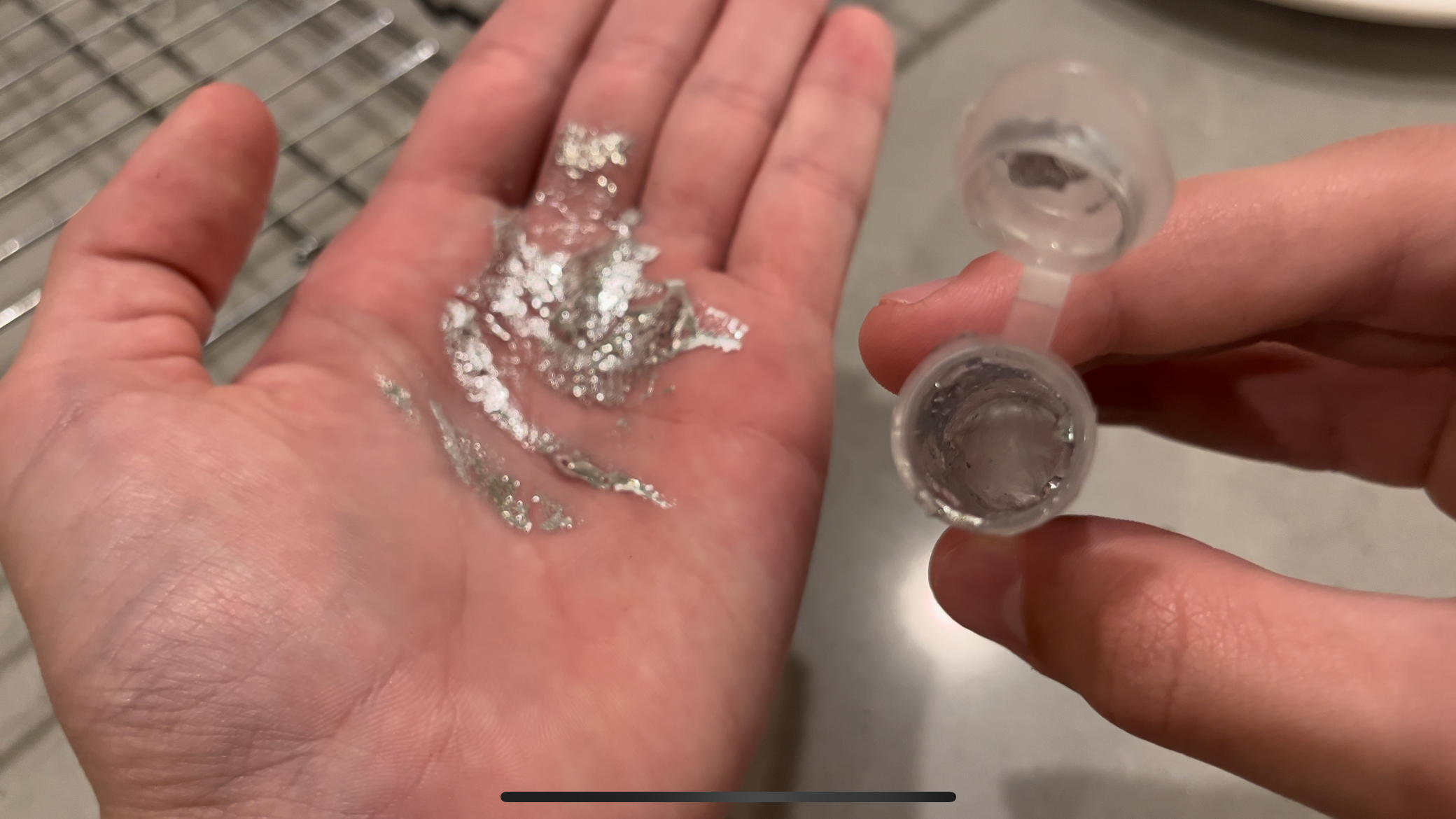
Gallium wets skin, as shown here.

Once oxides have been removed from the substrate surface, most liquid metals will wet most metallic surfaces. At room temperature, liquid metals are often reactive and soluble to metallic surfaces, though some solid metals are resistant to attack by the common liquid metals. For example gallium is corrosive to all metals except tungsten and tantalum, which have a high resistance to corrosion, more so than niobium, titanium, and molybdenum.

Similar to indium, gallium and gallium-containing alloys have the ability to wet to many non-metallic surfaces such as glass and quartz. Gently rubbing the alloy into the surface may help induce wetting. However, this observation of "wetting by rubbing into glass surface" has created a widely spread misconception that the gallium-based liquid metals wet glass surfaces, as if the liquid breaks free of the oxide skin and wets the surface. The reality is the opposite: the oxide makes the liquid wet the glass. In more details: as the liquid is rubbed into and spread onto the glass surface, the liquid oxidizes and coats the glass with a thin layer of oxide (solid) residues, on which the liquid metal wets. In other words, what is seen is a gallium-based liquid metal wetting its solid oxide, not glass. Apparently, this misconception was caused by the super-fast oxidation of the liquid gallium in even a trace amount of oxygen, which meant that nobody observed the true behavior of a liquid gallium on glass until research at the UCLA debunked the myth by testing Galinstan, a gallium-based alloy that is liquid at room temperature, in an oxygen-free environment.

These alloys form a thin dull looking oxide skin that is easily dispersed with mild agitation. The oxide-free surfaces are bright and lustrous.

== Applications ==
Applications of liquid metals include thermostats, switches, barometers, heat transfer systems, and thermal cooling and heating designs. They can also be used to conduct heat and electricity between non-metallic and metallic surfaces. Due to their free-flowing nature, another potential application is wearable and medical devices, where material deformability is important.

Liquid metal is sometimes used as a thermal interface material between coolers and processors because of its high thermal conductivity. The PlayStation 5 video game console uses liquid metal to cool components inside the console. Liquid metal cooled nuclear reactors also use them.

Liquid metal can sometimes be used for biological applications, such as making interconnects that flex without fatigue. As Galinstan is not particularly toxic, wires made from silicone with a core of liquid metal would be ideal for intracardiac pacemakers and neural implants where delicate brain tissue cannot tolerate a conventional solid implant. In fact, a wire constructed of this material can be stretched to 3 or even 5 times its length and still conduct electricity, returning to its original size and shape with no loss.

Due to their unique combination of high surface tension and fluidic deformability, liquid metals are useful for creating soft actuators. The force-generating mechanisms in liquid metal actuators are typically achieved by modulation of their surface tension. For instance, a liquid metal droplet can be designed to bridge two moving parts (e.g., in robotic systems) in such a way to generate contraction when the surface tension increases. The principles of muscle-like contraction in liquid metal actuators have been studied for their potential as a next-generation artificial muscle that offers several liquid-specific advantages over other solid materials.

Liquid-mirror telescopes can use liquid metals formed into a parabola through a spinning tank to serve as the primary mirror of a reflecting telescope.

The Spallation Neutron Source employs liquid metals as targets for generating pulsed neutron beams.

== See also ==
- Electromagnetic pump
- Fusible alloy
- Galinstan
- Sodium–potassium alloy
- T-1000
