= Bismuth–indium =

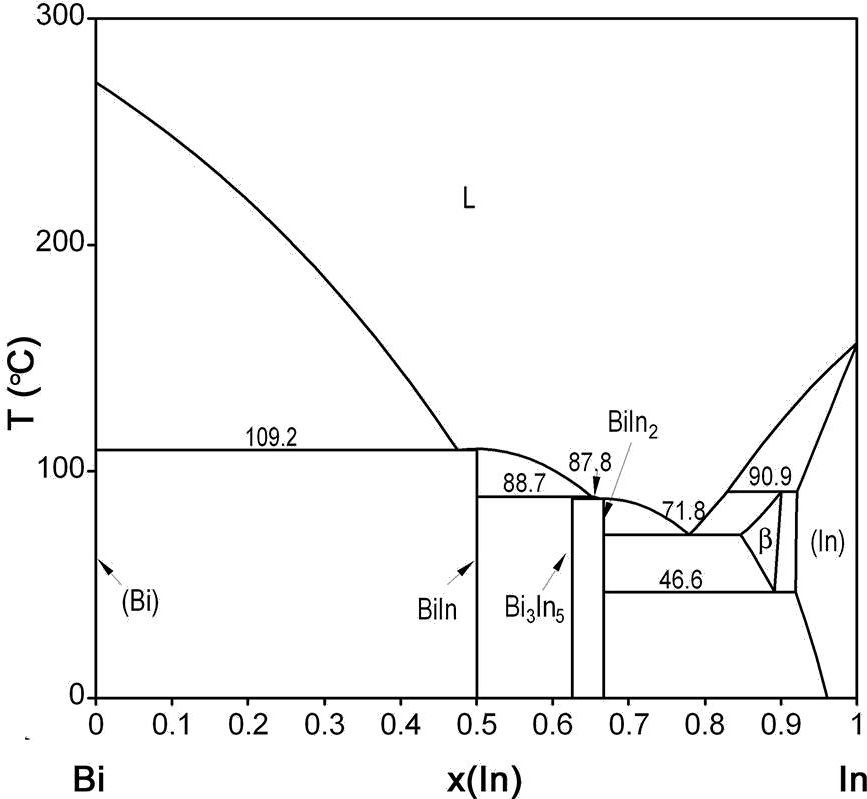
Bi-In phase diagram. L stands for liquid.

The elements bismuth and indium have relatively low melting points when compared to other metals, and their alloy bismuth–indium (Bi–In) is classified as a fusible alloy. It has a melting point lower than the eutectic point of the tin–lead alloy. The most common application of the Bi-In alloy is as a low temperature solder, which can also contain, besides bismuth and indium, lead, cadmium, and tin.

== Metals ==
=== Bismuth ===
Bismuth has many unique characteristics. When solidifying, bismuth's volume expands by roughly 2.32%. Its electrical resistance is twice as high in its solid state than in its liquid form. Bismuth has one of the lowest thermal conductivities of pure elemental metals. It is fragile, highly diamagnetic and it has a magnetic susceptibility of −1.68×10^{−5} mks. Bismuth is used as catalyst in the production of plastics and cosmetics, as an additive in steel alloys, and in electronics. It has a rhombohedral (Biα) structure, with an atomic radius of 1.54 Å, electronegativity of 1.83, and valence of +3 and +5.

=== Indium ===
Indium is a metal softer than lead (hardness of 0.9 HB), permitting it to be scratched by a nail. It is also malleable, ductile and has a thermal conductivity value of 0.78 W/m°C (85 °C). It also has the capacity of wetting glass, quartz and other ceramic materials. It maintains the plasticity and ductility when exposed to cryogenic environments and has a big gap between the melting point and the boiling point (156.6 °C and 2080 °C respectively). Under compression, it has high plasticity that allows almost unlimited deformation (2.14 MPa of compression resistance) and under tensile it has low elongation (4 MPa of tensile resistance). Indium is used in dental alloys, semiconductor components, nuclear reactor panels, sodium lamps, strengthening factor in lead-based welds and low melting temperature welds. The metal has a body centered tetragonal structure, atomic radius of 1.63 Å, electronegativity of 1.81 and valence of +3 or +1, the trivalent state being the more common.

== Common compositions of alloys ==
The most common application of this alloy is as a solder, with the composition of 95wt% of In and 5wt% of Bi. The liquidus line of this composition occurs at 423 K (150 °C; 302 °F), and the solidus line at 398 K (125 °C; 257 °F), being the first solid phase to be formed during the cooling process In, with Bi as a substitutional solid solution.

With a smaller application area, due to difficulties on the process of synthesizing, is the alloy composed by 33 wt% of In and 67wt% of Bi. This alloy presents a eutectic temperature of 382 K (109 °C; 228.2 °F). The resistance to thermal fatigue of this material is higher, but the quantity of slag when compared to the alloy between tin and lead.

There is, on the market a solder composed by 49 wt% of Bi, 21 wt% of In, 18 wt% of Pb, and 12 wt% of Sn, called commercially solder 136. This alloy presents a density of 8.58 g/cm^{3}, tensile strength of 43 MPa, toughness of 14HB, eutectic temperature of 331 K (58 °C; 136.4 °F), thermic coefficient of expansion of 12.8×10^{−6}/K. It is used to parts where precision is necessary, as in inspections, and fusible cores to wax patterns compounds.

Another alloy also on the market is the solder 117, composed of 44.7 wt% of Bi, 22.60 wt% of Pb, 19 wt% of In, 8.30 wt% of Sn, and 5.30 wt% of Cd. The density of this alloy is 8.86g/cm_{3}, tensile strength of 37 MPa, toughness of 12HB, eutectic temperature of 320 K (47 °C; 116.6 °F). It is also used to parts on inspection equipment, spindles for machining (polishing), molds for development of prosthesis and dental molds.

Other commercially produced compositions include

- Solder 174: 26 wt% of In, 17 wt% of Sn, and 57 wt% of Bi, presenting a eutectic temperature of 352 K (79 °C; 174.2 °F).
- 32.5 wt% of Bi, 16.5 wt% of Sn, and 51 wt% of In, presenting a eutectic temperature of 333 K (60 °C; 140 °F).
- 48 wt% of Bi, 25.63 wt% of Pb, 12.77 wt% of Sn, 9.6 wt% of Cd and 4 wt% of In, present a liquids temperature of 338 K (65 °C; 149 °F), and a solidus temperature of 334 K (61 °C; 141.8 °F).

The influence of each element

- Antimony increases strength without affecting wettability.
- Bismuth significantly improves the wettability of the solder. When the composition is more than 47% Bi, the alloy will expand upon cooling.
- Cadmium quickly oxidizes, resulting in tarnish and slow soldering. It improves the mechanical properties of the alloys.
- Indium lowers the melting point at a rate of 1.45 °C per 1 wt% of added In. It easily oxidizes, enables soldering for cryogenic applications, and allows soldering of nonmetals. It facilitates the fabrication process if compared with Bi.
- Lead, in presence of In, forms a compound that has a phase change at 387 K (114 °C; 237.20 °F).

== Phase diagram and solubility ==
Three intermetallic phases exist at room temperature in the Bi-In system: BiIn, Bi_{3}In_{5} and BiIn_{2}. Above the room temperature there is another phase named ε.

The solubility of the basic elements is 0–0.005 wt% of In in the Bi sublattice and ~0–14 wt% of Bi in the In sites. These values can be explained by the Hume-Rothery rules, where the crystalline structure must to be the same, the atomic radius must differ 15% or less, the valency must to be the same and the electronegativity of the two components must to be similar.

Parameters of the elements
Parameter	Bi (α)	In
Crystal structure	Rhombohedral	Body centered tetragonal
Atomic radius (Å)	1.54	1.63
Electronegativity	1.83	1.81
Valency	3.5	3

Main points on the equilibrium diagram.

When the two elements are mixed together, the alloy between Bi and In presents three eutectic points, being:

Eutectic points
wt% of In	wt% of Bi	T (K)	T (°C)	T (°F)	Phases formed upon cooling
32.6	67.4	382.7	109.7	229.46	Bi(α) and BiIn
49	51	361.7	88.7	191.66	Bi_{3}In_{5} and BiIn_{2}
66.7	33.3	345.7	72.7	162.86	BiIn_{2} and ε

When cooled from the melt, Bi-In alloys form lamellar structures. There is one eutectoid point on the diagram, at 83 wt% of In. The eutectoid temperature is 322 K (49 °C; 120.20 °F). In the cooling process the phase ε will form BiIn_{2} and In. In the peritectic point, with the composition of 86 wt% of In, the liquid and the already formed In_{(s)} will result in the phase ε. There are three intermetallic phases formed in the equilibrium:

- BiIn (from 00005 to 35.4 wt% of In), with a tetragonal structure and 2 atoms per unit cell.
- Bi_{3}In_{5} (from 47.5 to 97.97 wt% of In), with a tetragonal structure and 4 atoms per unit cell.
- BiIn_{2} (from 52.5 to 53.5 wt% of In), having a hexagonal structure with 2 atoms per unit cell.

There is regions on the diagram with were determinate thermodynamically due the process of formation take too much time or difficulties on the visualization of the phase.

The lowest fusion value is observed at 345.7 K (72.7 °C; 162.86 °F) and 66.7 wt% of In. In a cooling process the phases that will be formed is the BiIn_{2} and ε. There is also a metastable phase BiIn_{3}, occurring at 62 wt% of In.

== General considerations ==
Fusible alloys present a precipitation hardening (aging), so the mechanic properties will be dependent of the melting conditions, solidification rate, time since the melting, and the conditions in which the alloy will be used. Hence the advantages of the Bi-In alloy, when compared to the traditional ones based on Sn or Pb, is a larger thermal fatigue resistance, and a lower melting point. Disadvantages of Bi-In alloys are relatively low ductility and higher percentage of produced slag.
