= Barnabas Wood =

American dentist and inventor (1819–1875)

Barnabas Wood (May 17, 1819 in Guilderland, New York – May 30, 1875 in Albany, New York) was an American dentist and inventor best known for his discovery of the fusible alloy known as Wood's metal.

== Professional life ==
After briefly attending Albany Medical College in 1841, Wood began practicing dentistry in the company of his brother. In 1851, he moved to Nashville, Tennessee, where he earned his medical degree from the University of Nashville in 1852.

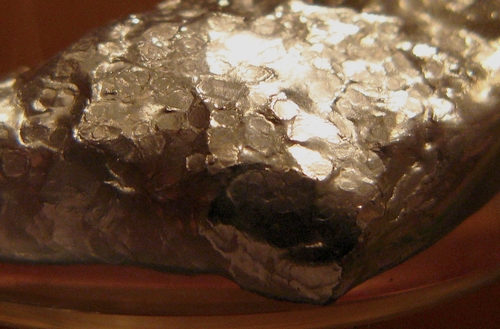
A piece of Wood's metal

In 1860, Wood announced the discovery of an alloy of bismuth, tin, lead, and cadmium, in proportions such that it had a very low melting point; James Dwight Dana subsequently proposed that it be named "Wood's Fusible Metal" in his honor.

Wood remained in Tennessee until the American Civil War began in 1861, at which point his "sympathy with the North" led him to return to New York. In 1867, he earned a degree from the Pennsylvania College of Dental Surgery.

Wood also edited various periodicals, including The American Magazine and Repository of Useful Literature (1841–42), Southern Journal of Medical and Physical Sciences (1853–?), and The Dental Circular and Examiner (1860–1865).
