= Praseodymium pentaphosphide =

Identifiers
CAS Number	54466-02-3
3D model (JSmol)	Interactive image
- InChI: InChI=1S/5P.Sm Key: BOIVIBBFKRHHPN-UHFFFAOYSA-N
- SMILES: [Pr+2].[P-].[P-].[P].[P].[P]

Properties
Chemical formula	P_{5}Pr
Molar mass	295.78
Appearance	black crystals
Density	3.8 g/cm^{3}
Melting point	697 °C (1,287 °F; 970 K)
- Except where otherwise noted, data are given for materials in their standard state (at 25 °C [77 °F], 100 kPa). Infobox references

Praseodymium pentaphosphide is a binary inorganic compound of praseodymium metal and phosphorus with the chemical formula PrP_{5}.

== Preparation ==
Praseodymium pentaphosphide can be prepared by heating stoichiometric amounts of praseodymium and phosphorus at 700 °C:

Pr + 5P → PrP_{5}

== Properties ==
Praseodymium pentaphosphide crystallizes in the monoclinic crystal system, space group P2_{1}/m, cell parameters a = 0.4938 nm, b = 0.9595 nm, c = 0.5482 nm, β = 103.64°, Z = 2, with the same structure as neodymium pentaphosphide (NdP_{5}).

The compound is formed by a peritectic reaction at a temperature of 697 °C.
