= Cerrolow 136 =

Alloy used for soldering

Cerrolow 136, is a fusible alloy that becomes liquid at approximately 58 °C (136 °F). It is a eutectic alloy of bismuth, lead, indium, and tin, with the following percentages by weight: 49% Bi, 18% Pb, 21% In, 12% Sn

It is also known as ChipQuik desoldering alloy and Lens Alloy 136, used for mounting lenses and other optical components for grinding. it is used for mounting small delicate oddly-shaped components for machining and as a solder in low-temperature physics.. It slightly expands on cooling, and shows slight shrinkage in couple hours afterwards.

The Young's Modulus is approximately 2.5 million psi (17.24 GPa)

== Similar metals ==
Alloy	Melting point	Eutectic?	Bismuth %	Lead %	Tin %	Indium %	Cadmium %	Thallium %	Gallium %	Antimony %
Rose's metal	98 °C (208 °F)	No	50	25	25	—N/a	—N/a	—N/a	—N/a	—N/a
Cerrosafe	74 °C (165 °F)	No	42.5	37.7	11.3	—N/a	8.5	—N/a	—N/a	—N/a
Wood's metal	70 °C (158 °F)	Yes	50	26.7	13.3	—N/a	10	—N/a	—N/a	—N/a
Field's metal	62 °C (144 °F)	Yes	32.5	—N/a	16.5	51	—N/a	—N/a	—N/a	—N/a
Cerrolow 136	58 °C (136 °F)	Yes	49	18	12	21	—N/a	—N/a	—N/a	—N/a
Cerrolow 117	47.2 °C (117 °F)	Yes	44.7	22.6	8.3	19.1	5.3	—N/a	—N/a	—N/a
Bi-Pb-Sn-Cd-In-Tl	41.5 °C (107 °F)	Yes	40.3	22.2	10.7	17.7	8.1	1.1	—N/a	—N/a
Gallium	29.8 °C (86 °F)	Pure metal	—N/a	—N/a	—N/a	—N/a	—N/a	—N/a	100	—N/a
Galinstan	−19 °C (−2 °F)	No	<1.5	—N/a	9.5–10.5	21–22	—N/a	—N/a	68–69	<1.5
