= Lamellar structure =

Structure composed of thin alternating layers of different materials

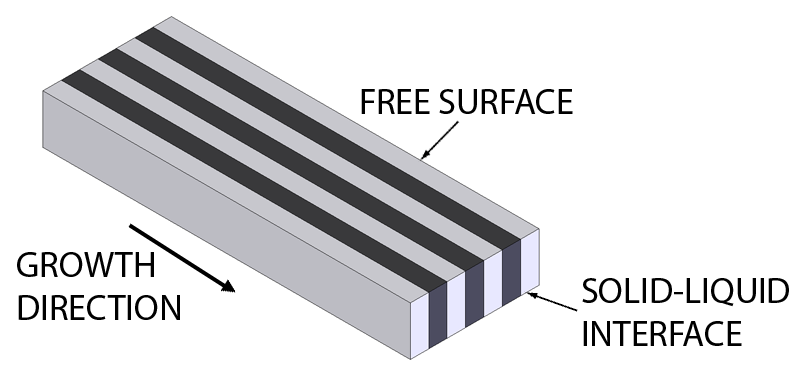
A schematic of a lamellar structure for a eutectic system

In materials science, lamellar structures or microstructures are composed of fine, alternating layers of different materials in the form of lamellae. They are often observed in cases where a phase transition front moves quickly, leaving behind two solid products, as in rapid cooling of eutectic (such as solder) or eutectoid (such as pearlite) systems.

Such conditions force phases of different composition to form but allow little time for diffusion to produce those phases' equilibrium compositions. Fine lamellae solve this problem by shortening the diffusion distance between phases, but their high surface energy makes them unstable and prone to break up when annealing allows diffusion to progress. A deeper eutectic or more rapid cooling will result in finer lamellae; as the size of an individual lamellum approaches zero, the system will instead retain its high-temperature structure. Two common cases of this include cooling a liquid to form an amorphous solid, and cooling eutectoid austenite to form martensite.

In biology, normal adult bones possess a lamellar structure which may be disrupted by some diseases.
