= Newton's metal =

Low-melting-point alloy of bismuth, lead and tin

Newton's metal is a fusible alloy with a low melting point. Its composition by weight is 8 parts bismuth, 5 parts lead and 3 parts tin; its melting point is 97 °C.

Newton's metal is comparable to Cerrobend, but avoids its toxic cadmium content. This has encouraged its use for medical applications for easily shaped shielding during radiotherapy.
