= Rose's metal =

Alloy with a low melting point

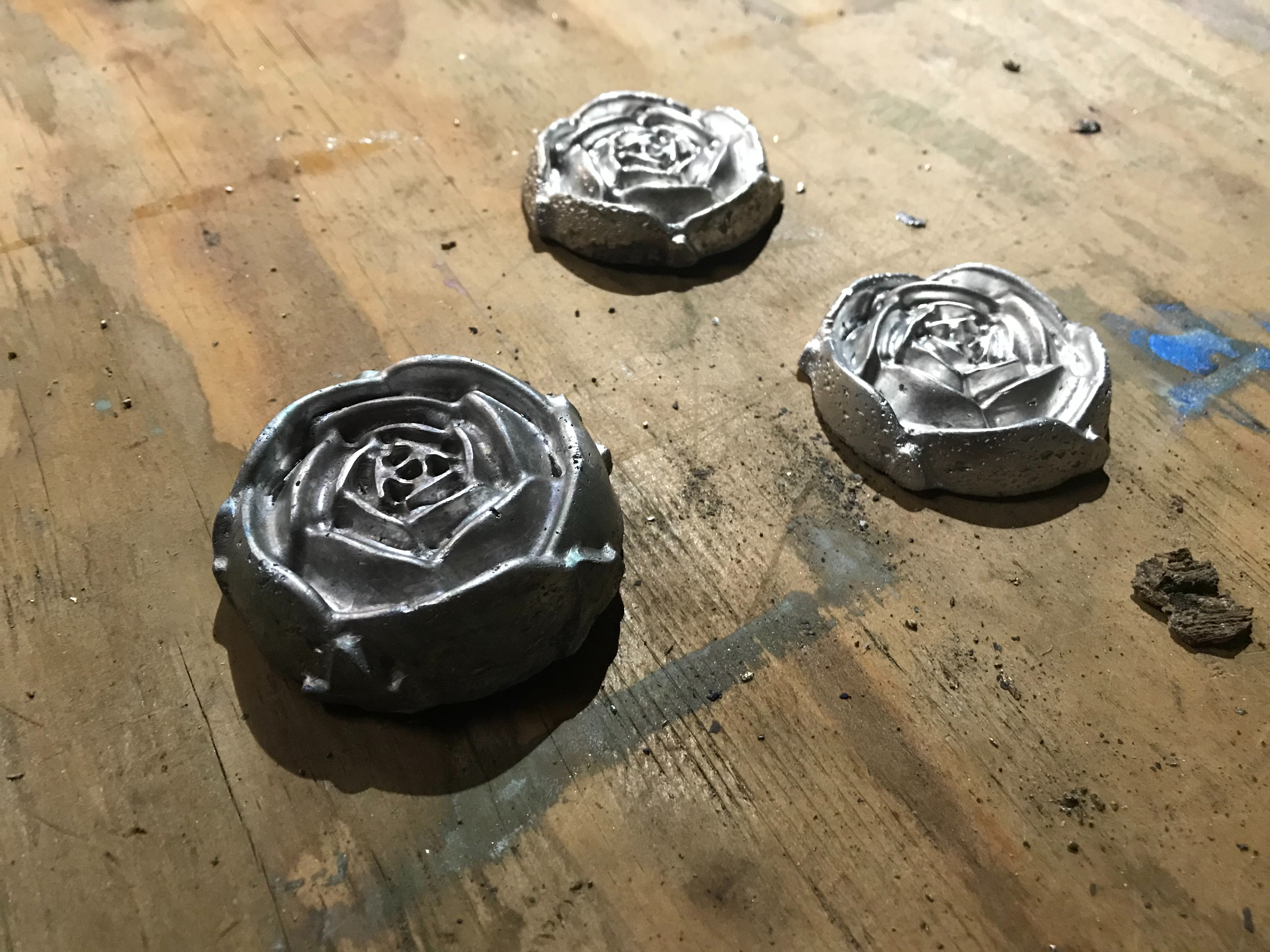
Rose-shaped cast of Rose's metal

Rose's metal, Rose metal or Rose's alloy is a fusible alloy with a low melting point.

Rose's metal consists of 50% bismuth, 25–28% lead and 22–25% tin. Its melting point is between 94 and 98 °C (201 and 208 °F). The alloy does not appreciably contract or expand on solidification, this characteristic being a function of its bismuth percentage, but does slightly contract on cooling.

== Uses ==
Rose's metal has several common uses:

1. As a solder. It was used to secure cast iron railings and balusters in pockets in stone bases and steps.
2. As a heat transfer medium in heating baths.
3. As a malleable filling to prevent tubes and pipes from crimping when bent. Rose's metal is melted and poured into the tube. It then solidifies in place but remains malleable. This allows the tube or pipe to be bent and reworked without crimping. After the desired shape is achieved, the Rose's metal is remelted and removed, leaving the pipe or tube in its modified shape.

== History ==
It was discovered by the German chemist Valentin Rose the Elder, the grandfather of Heinrich Rose.

== Similar metals ==
| Alloy | Melting point | Eutectic? | Bismuth % | Lead % | Tin % | Indium % | Cadmium % | Thallium % | Gallium % | Antimony % |
|---|---|---|---|---|---|---|---|---|---|---|
| Rose's metal | 98 °C (208 °F) | No | 50 | 25 | 25 | —N/a | —N/a | —N/a | —N/a | —N/a |
| Cerrosafe | 74 °C (165 °F) | No | 42.5 | 37.7 | 11.3 | —N/a | 8.5 | —N/a | —N/a | —N/a |
| Wood's metal | 70 °C (158 °F) | Yes | 50 | 26.7 | 13.3 | —N/a | 10 | —N/a | —N/a | —N/a |
| Field's metal | 62 °C (144 °F) | Yes | 32.5 | —N/a | 16.5 | 51 | —N/a | —N/a | —N/a | —N/a |
| Cerrolow 136 | 58 °C (136 °F) | Yes | 49 | 18 | 12 | 21 | —N/a | —N/a | —N/a | —N/a |
| Cerrolow 117 | 47.2 °C (117 °F) | Yes | 44.7 | 22.6 | 8.3 | 19.1 | 5.3 | —N/a | —N/a | —N/a |
| Bi-Pb-Sn-Cd-In-Tl | 41.5 °C (107 °F) | Yes | 40.3 | 22.2 | 10.7 | 17.7 | 8.1 | 1.1 | —N/a | —N/a |
| Gallium | 29.8 °C (86 °F) | Pure metal | —N/a | —N/a | —N/a | —N/a | —N/a | —N/a | 100 | —N/a |
| Galinstan | −19 °C (−2 °F) | No | <1.5 | —N/a | 9.5–10.5 | 21–22 | —N/a | —N/a | 68–69 | <1.5 |
