= Field's metal =

Fusible alloy made of a eutectic of bismuth, indium, and tin

Field's metal, also known as Field's alloy, is a fusible alloy that becomes liquid at approximately 62 °C (144 °F). It is named after its inventor, Simon Quellen Field. It is a eutectic alloy of bismuth, indium, and tin, with the following mass fractions: 32.5% Bi, 51% In, 16.5% Sn.

When prepared, Field's metal can be melted in hot water. Field's metal is costly because its major component indium is expensive, priced at around double the price of silver. Because it includes neither lead nor cadmium, it is much less toxic than Wood's metal. It can be used for small-run die casting and rapid prototyping.

This alloy has been investigated as a possible liquid metal coolant in advanced nuclear power system designs. Field's metal is also of interest to nanotechnology researchers.

== Similar alloys ==
Alloy	Melting point	Eutectic?	Bismuth %	Lead %	Tin %	Indium %	Cadmium %	Thallium %	Gallium %	Antimony %
Rose's metal	98 °C (208 °F)	No	50	25	25	—N/a	—N/a	—N/a	—N/a	—N/a
Cerrosafe	74 °C (165 °F)	No	42.5	37.7	11.3	—N/a	8.5	—N/a	—N/a	—N/a
Wood's metal	70 °C (158 °F)	Yes	50	26.7	13.3	—N/a	10	—N/a	—N/a	—N/a
Field's metal	62 °C (144 °F)	Yes	32.5	—N/a	16.5	51	—N/a	—N/a	—N/a	—N/a
Cerrolow 136	58 °C (136 °F)	Yes	49	18	12	21	—N/a	—N/a	—N/a	—N/a
Cerrolow 117	47.2 °C (117 °F)	Yes	44.7	22.6	8.3	19.1	5.3	—N/a	—N/a	—N/a
Bi-Pb-Sn-Cd-In-Tl	41.5 °C (107 °F)	Yes	40.3	22.2	10.7	17.7	8.1	1.1	—N/a	—N/a
Gallium	29.8 °C (86 °F)	Pure metal	—N/a	—N/a	—N/a	—N/a	—N/a	—N/a	100	—N/a
Galinstan	−19 °C (−2 °F)	No	<1.5	—N/a	9.5–10.5	21–22	—N/a	—N/a	68–69	<1.5
