= Fusible alloy =

Easily fused metal alloy

A fusible alloy is a metal alloy capable of being easily fused, i.e. easily meltable, at relatively low temperatures. Fusible alloys are commonly, but not necessarily, eutectic alloys.

Sometimes the term "fusible alloy" is used to describe alloys with a melting point below 183 °C (361 °F; 456 K). Fusible alloys in this sense are used for solder.

== Introduction ==
Fusible alloys are typically made from low melting metals. There are 14 low melting metallic elements that are stable for practical handling. These are in 2 distinct groups: The 5 alkali metals have 1 s electron and melt between +181 (Li) and +28 (Cs) Celsius; The 9 poor metals have 10 d electrons and from none (Zn, Cd, Hg) to three (Bi) p electrons, they melt between -38 (Hg) and +419 (Zn) Celsius. From a practical view, low-melting alloys can be divided into the following categories:

- Mercury-containing alloys
- Only alkali metal-containing alloys
- Gallium-containing alloys (but neither alkali metal nor mercury)
- Only bismuth, lead, tin, cadmium, zinc, indium, and sometimes thallium-containing alloys
- Other alloys (rarely used)

A practical reason here is that the chemical behaviour of alkali metals is very distinct from poor metals. Of the 9 poor metals Hg (mp -38 C) and Ga (mp +29 C) have each their distinct practical issues, and the remaining 7 poor metals from In (mp +156 C) to Zn (mp +419 C) can be viewed together. Of elements which might be viewed as related but do not share the distinct properties of poor metals: Po is estimated to melt at 254 C and might be poor metal by properties but is too radioactive (longest halflife 125 years) for practical use; At same reasoning as Po; Sb melts at 630 C and is regarded as semimetal rather than poor metal; Te is also regarded as semimetal not poor metal; of other metals, next lowest melting point is Pu, but its melting point at 640 Celsius leaves a 220 degree gap between Zn and Pu, thus making the "poor metals" from In to Zn a natural group.

Some reasonably well-known fusible alloys are Wood's metal, Field's metal, Rose metal, Galinstan, and NaK.

== Applications ==
Melted fusible alloys can be used as coolants as they are stable under heating and can give much higher thermal conductivity than most other coolants; particularly with alloys made with a high thermal conductivity metal such as indium or sodium. Metals with low neutron cross-section are used for cooling nuclear reactors.

Such alloys are used for making the fusible plugs inserted in the furnace crowns of steam boilers, as a safeguard in the event of the water level being allowed to fall too low. When this happens the plug, being no longer covered with water, is heated to such a temperature that it melts and allows the contents of the boiler to escape into the furnace. In automatic fire sprinklers the orifices of each sprinkler is closed with a plug that is held in place by fusible metal, which melts and liberates the water when, owing to an outbreak of fire in the room, the temperature rises above a predetermined limit.

Bismuth on solidification expands by about 3.3% by volume. Alloys with at least half of bismuth display this property too. This can be used for mounting of small parts, e.g. for machining, as they will be tightly held.

== Low-melting alloys and metallic elements ==
=== Well-known alloys ===
Alloy	Melting point	Eutectic?	Bismuth %	Lead %	Tin %	Indium %	Cadmium %	Thallium %	Gallium %	Antimony %
Rose's metal	98 °C (208 °F)	No	50	25	25	—N/a	—N/a	—N/a	—N/a	—N/a
Cerrosafe	74 °C (165 °F)	No	42.5	37.7	11.3	—N/a	8.5	—N/a	—N/a	—N/a
Wood's metal	70 °C (158 °F)	Yes	50	26.7	13.3	—N/a	10	—N/a	—N/a	—N/a
Field's metal	62 °C (144 °F)	Yes	32.5	—N/a	16.5	51	—N/a	—N/a	—N/a	—N/a
Cerrolow 136	58 °C (136 °F)	Yes	49	18	12	21	—N/a	—N/a	—N/a	—N/a
Cerrolow 117	47.2 °C (117 °F)	Yes	44.7	22.6	8.3	19.1	5.3	—N/a	—N/a	—N/a
Bi-Pb-Sn-Cd-In-Tl	41.5 °C (107 °F)	Yes	40.3	22.2	10.7	17.7	8.1	1.1	—N/a	—N/a
Gallium	29.8 °C (86 °F)	Pure metal	—N/a	—N/a	—N/a	—N/a	—N/a	—N/a	100	—N/a
Galinstan	−19 °C (−2 °F)	No	<1.5	—N/a	9.5–10.5	21–22	—N/a	—N/a	68–69	<1.5

=== Other alloys ===
Starting with a table of component elements and selected binary and multiple systems ordered by melting point:

Low melting alloys and metallic elements
Composition in weight-percent	Melting point	Eutectic?	Name or remark
Cs 73.71, K 22.14, Na 4.14	−78.2 °C (−108.8 °F)	yes	"CsNaK", reactive with water and air
Hg 91.5, Tl 8.5	−58 °C (−72 °F)	yes	used in low-reading thermometers
Hg 100	−38.8 °C (−37.8 °F)	(yes)	
Cs 77.0, K 23.0	−37.5 °C (−35.5 °F)		
K 76.7, Na 23.3	−12.7 °C (9.1 °F)	yes	
K 78.0, Na 22.0	−11 °C (12 °F)	no	NaK
Ga 61, In 25, Sn 13, Zn 1	8.5 °C (47.3 °F)	yes	
Ga 62.5, In 21.5, Sn 16.0	10.7 °C (51.3 °F)	yes	Galinstan alloy
Ga 69.8, In 17.6, Sn 12.5	10.8 °C (51.4 °F)	no	Galinstan alloy
Ga 68.5, In 21.5, Sn 10	11 °C (52 °F)	no	Galinstan alloy
Ga 75.5, In 24.5	15.7 °C (60.3 °F)	yes	
Cs 100	28.6 °C (83.5 °F)	(yes)	
Ga 100	29.8 °C (85.6 °F)	(yes)	
Rb 100	39.30 °C (102.74 °F)	(yes)	
Bi 40.3, Pb 22.2, In 17.2, Sn 10.7, Cd 8.1, Tl 1.1	41.5 °C (106.7 °F)	yes	
Bi 40.63, Pb 22.1, In 18.1, Sn 10.65, Cd 8.2	46.5 °C (115.7 °F)		
Bi 44.7, Pb 22.6, In 19.1, Cd 5.3, Sn 8.3	47 °C (117 °F)	yes	Cerrolow 117. Used as a solder in low-temperature physics. This alloy is also commonly referred to, and marketed as Low-Melt 47 within the UK
Bi 49, Pb 18, In 21, Sn 12	58 °C (136 °F)		ChipQuik desoldering alloy. Cerrolow 136. Slightly expands on cooling, later shows slight shrinkage in couple hours afterwards. Used as a solder in low-temperature physics. Lens Alloy 136, used for mounting lenses and other optical components for grinding. Used for mounting small delicate oddly-shaped components for machining.
Bi 32.5, In 51.0, Sn 16.5	60.5 °C (140.9 °F)	yes	Field's metal
K 100	63.5 °C (146.3 °F)	(yes)	
Bi 50, Pb 26.7, Sn 13.3, Cd 10	70 °C (158 °F)	yes	Cerrobend. Used in low-temperature physics as a solder.
Bi 49.5, Pb 27.3, Sn 13.1, Cd 10.1	70.9 °C (159.6 °F)	yes	Lipowitz's alloy
Bi 50.0, Pb 26.7, Sn 13.3, Cd 10	70 °C (158 °F)	yes	Wood's metal, Exactly the same as Cerrobend. Also known as Low Melt 70 due to its precise melting point.
In 66.3, Bi 33.7	72 °C (162 °F)	yes	
Bi 42.5, Pb 37.7, Sn 11.3, Cd 8.5	74 °C (165 °F)	no	Cerrosafe
Bi 57, In 26, Sn 17	79 °C (174 °F)	yes	
Bi 54, In 29.7, Sn 16.3	81 °C (178 °F)	yes	
Bi 56, Sn 30, In 14	79–91 °C (174–196 °F)	no	ChipQuik desoldering alloy, lead-free
Bi 50, Pb 30, Sn 20, Impurities	92 °C (198 °F)	no	Lichtenberg's alloy, also called Onions' Fusible Alloy
Bi 52.5, Pb 32.0, Sn 15.5	95 °C (203 °F)	yes	
Bi 52, Pb 32.0, Sn 16	96 °C (205 °F)	yes	Bi52. Good fatigue resistance combined with low melting point. Reasonable shear strength and fatigue properties. Combination with lead-tin solder may dramatically lower melting point and lead to joint failure.
Bi 50.0, Pb 31.2, Sn 18.8	97 °C (207 °F)	no	Newton's metal
Na 100	97.8 °C (208.0 °F)	(yes)	
Bi 50.0, Pb 28.0, Sn 22.0	94–98 °C (201–208 °F)	no	Rose's metal
Bi 55.5, Pb 44.5	125 °C (257 °F)	yes	
Bi 58, Sn 42	138 °C (280 °F)	yes	Bi58. Reasonable shear strength and fatigue properties. Combination with lead-tin solder may dramatically lower melting point and lead to joint failure. Low-temperature eutectic solder with high strength. Particularly strong, very brittle. Used extensively in through-hole technology assemblies in IBM mainframe computers where low soldering temperature was required. Can be used as a coating of copper particles to facilitate their bonding under pressure/heat and creating a conductive metallurgical joint. Sensitive to shear rate. Good for electronics. Used in thermoelectric applications. Good thermal fatigue performance. Yield strength 7,119 psi (49.08 MPa), tensile strength 5,400 psi (37 MPa).
Bi 57, Sn 43	139 °C (282 °F)	yes	
In 100	157 °C (315 °F)	(yes)	In99. Used for die attachment of some chips. More suitable for soldering gold, dissolution rate of gold is 17 times slower than in tin-based solders and up to 20% of gold can be tolerated without significant embrittlement. Good performance at cryogenic temperatures. Wets many surfaces incl. quartz, glass, and many ceramics. Deforms indefinitely under load. Does not become brittle even at low temperatures. Used as a solder in low-temperature physics, will bond to aluminium. Can be used for soldering to thin metal films or glass with an ultrasonic soldering iron.
Li 100	180.5 °C (356.9 °F)	(yes)	
Sn 62.3, Pb 37.7	183 °C (361 °F)	yes	
Sn 63.0, Pb 37.0	183 °C (361 °F)	no	Eutectic solder. Sn63, ASTM63A, ASTM63B. Common in electronics; exceptional tinning and wetting properties, also good for stainless steel. One of the most common solders. Low cost and good bonding properties. Used in both SMT and through-hole electronics. Rapidly dissolves gold and silver, not recommended for those. Sn_{60}Pb_{40} is slightly cheaper and is often used instead for cost reasons, as the melting point difference is insignificant in practice. On slow cooling gives slightly brighter joints than Sn_{60}Pb_{40}. Yield strength 3,950 psi (27.2 MPa), tensile strength 4,442 psi (30.63 MPa).
Sn 91.0, Zn 9.0	198 °C (388 °F)	yes	KappAloy9 Designed specifically for Aluminum-to-Aluminum and Aluminum-to-Copper soldering. It has good corrosion resistance and tensile strength. Lies between soft solder and silver brazing alloys, thereby avoiding damage to critical electronics and substrate deformation and segregation. Best solder for Aluminum wire to Copper busses or Copper wire to Aluminum busses or contacts. UNS#: L91090
Sn 92.0, Zn 8.0	199 °C (390 °F)	no	Tin foil
Sn 100	231.9 °C (449.4 °F)	(yes)	Sn99. Good strength, non-dulling. Use in food processing equipment, wire tinning, and alloying. Susceptible to tin pest.
Bi 100	271.5 °C (520.7 °F)	(yes)	Used as a non-superconducting solder in low-temperature physics. Does not wet metals well, forms a mechanically weak joint.
Tl 100	304 °C (579 °F)	(yes)	
Cd 100	321.1 °C (610.0 °F)	(yes)	
Pb 100	327.5 °C (621.5 °F)	(yes)	
Zn 100	419.5 °C (787.1 °F)	(yes)	For soldering aluminium. Good wettability of aluminium, relatively good corrosion resistance.

Then organized by practical group and alphabetic symbols of components: Most of the pairwise phase diagrams of 2 component metal systems have data available for analysis, like at https://himikatus.ru/art/phase-diagr1/diagrams.php Taking the pairwise alloys of the 7 poor metals other than Hg and Ga, and ordering the pairs (total 21) by alphabetic of these elements Bi, Cd, In, Pb, Sn, Tl, Zn are as follows:

- Bi-Cd https://himikatus.ru/art/phase-diagr1/Bi-Cd.php simple eutectic (Bi at 271 C, Cd at 321, eutectic at 146)
- Bi-In https://himikatus.ru/art/phase-diagr1/Bi-In.php has ordered phases, eutectic at +72 - in table above
- Bi-Pb https://himikatus.ru/art/phase-diagr1/Bi-Pb.php eutectic at +125 - in table above
- Bi-Sn https://himikatus.ru/art/phase-diagr1/Bi-Sn.php eutectic at +139 - in table above
- Bi-Tl https://himikatus.ru/art/phase-diagr1/Bi-Tl.php an intermetallic alloy and the lower melting eutectic at +188
- Bi-Zn https://himikatus.ru/art/phase-diagr1/Bi-Zn.php eutectic at +255
- Cd-In https://himikatus.ru/art/phase-diagr1/Cd-In.php eutectic at +128
- Cd-Pb https://himikatus.ru/art/phase-diagr1/Cd-Pb.php eutectic at +248
- Cd-Sn https://himikatus.ru/art/phase-diagr1/Cd-Sn.php eutectic at +176
- Cd-Tl https://himikatus.ru/art/phase-diagr1/Cd-Tl.php eutectic at +204
- Cd-Zn https://himikatus.ru/art/phase-diagr1/Cd-Zn.php eutectic at +266
- In-Pb https://himikatus.ru/art/phase-diagr1/In-Pb.php is NOT eutectic because Pb solid solution in In only raises melting point
- In-Sn https://himikatus.ru/art/phase-diagr1/In-Sn.php eutectic at +120
- In-Tl https://himikatus.ru/art/phase-diagr1/In-Tl.php also NOT eutectic because Tl solid solution in In raises melting point
- In-Zn https://himikatus.ru/art/phase-diagr1/In-Zn.php eutectic at +143
- Pb-Sn https://himikatus.ru/art/phase-diagr1/Pb-Sn.php eutectic at +183 - in table above
- Pb-Tl https://himikatus.ru/art/phase-diagr1/Pb-Tl.php also NOT eutectic because the solid solution is higher melting than components
- Pb-Zn https://himikatus.ru/art/phase-diagr1/Pb-Zn.php eutectic at +318
- Sn-Tl https://himikatus.ru/art/phase-diagr1/Sn-Tl.php eutectic at +168
- Sn-Zn https://himikatus.ru/art/phase-diagr1/Sn-Zn.php eutectic at +198 - in table above
- Tl-Zn https://himikatus.ru/art/phase-diagr1/Tl-Zn.php eutectic at +292

Considering the binary systems between alkali metals: Li only has appreciable solubility in pair

- Li-Na https://himikatus.ru/art/phase-diagr1/Li-Na.php eutectic at +92

The other three alkali metals:

- K-Li https://himikatus.ru/art/phase-diagr1/K-Li.php
- Li-Rb https://himikatus.ru/art/phase-diagr1/Li-Rb.php
- Cs-Li https://himikatus.ru/art/phase-diagr1/Cs-Li.php

practically do not dissolve Li even when liquid and therefore their melting points are not lowered by presence of Li Na is in liquid phase miscible with all three heavier alkali metals, but on freezing forms intermetallic compounds and eutectics:

- K-Na https://himikatus.ru/art/phase-diagr1/K-Na.php eutectic at -12,6 - in table above
- Na-Rb https://himikatus.ru/art/phase-diagr1/Na-Rb.php eutectic at -4,5
- Cs-Na https://himikatus.ru/art/phase-diagr1/Cs-Na.php eutectic at -31,8

The 3 binary systems between the three heavier alkali metals are all miscible in solid at melting point, but all form poor solid solutions that have melting point minima. This is distinct from eutectic: at eutectic point, two solid phases coexist, and close to eutectic point, the liquidus temperature rises rapidly as just one separates, whereas at poor solid solution melting point minimum, there is a single solid phase, and away from the minimum the liquidus temperature rises only slowly.

- K-Rb https://himikatus.ru/art/phase-diagr1/K-Rb.php solid solution minimum mp +34
- Cs-K https://himikatus.ru/art/phase-diagr1/Cs-K.php solid solution minimum mp -38 - in table above
- Cs-Rb https://himikatus.ru/art/phase-diagr1/Cs-Rb.php solid solution minimum mp +10

== See also ==
- Liquid metal
- List of elements by melting point
