= Wood's metal =

Alloy of bismuth, lead, tin and cadmium

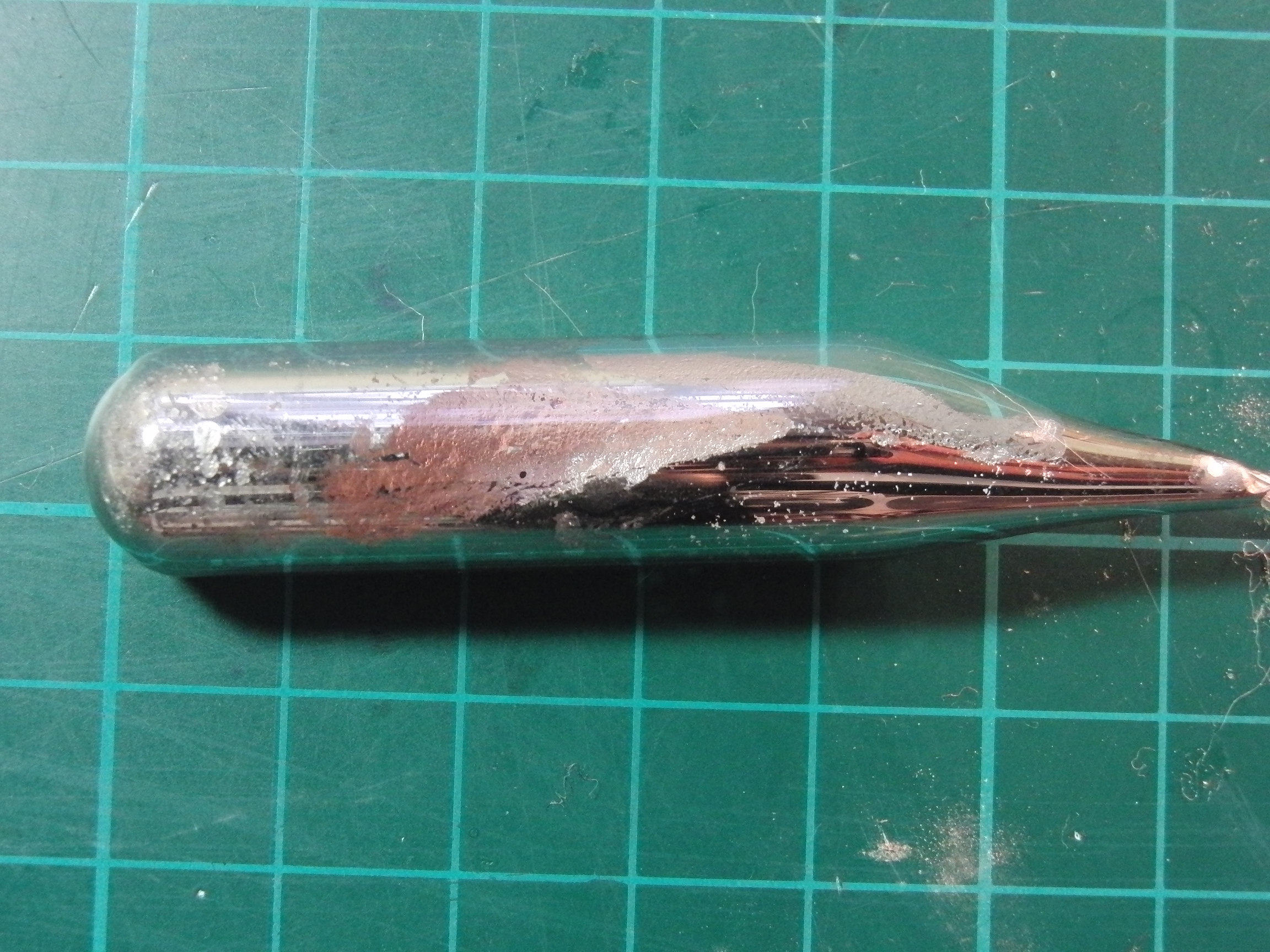
Wood's metal (in an ampoule)

Wood's metal, also known as Lipowitz's alloy or by the commercial names Cerrobend, Bendalloy, Pewtalloy and MCP 158, is a fusible metal alloy (having a low melting point) that is useful for soldering and making custom metal parts. The alloy is named for Barnabas Wood, who invented and patented the alloy in 1860. It is a eutectic alloy of 50% bismuth, 26.7% lead, 13.3% tin, and 10% cadmium by mass. It has a melting point of approximately 70 °C (158 °F). Its fumes are toxic, as well as being toxic on skin exposure.

== Applications ==
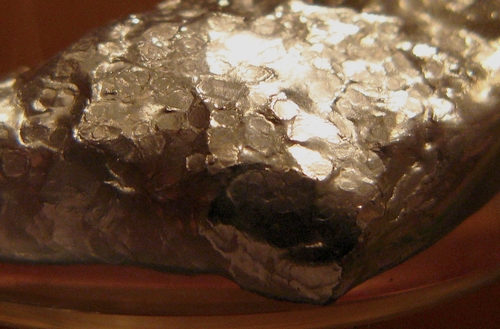
Wood's metal (in a visibly solid state)

As suggested by the trade names, Wood's metal is used to fill thin-walled tube so that it can be bent to a radius without kinking or collapsing. The filling is easily melted and run out of the tube after bending is completed. The low melting point and lack of contraction on freezing make Wood's metal suitable for this purpose.

Wood's Metal is also used for making fusible links in the sprinkler heads of commercial building automatic fire sprinkler systems. In the event of a fire, ambient temperature increases enough to melt the link, releasing the water. A similar use is fusible plugs in boilers.

Uses also include making custom-shaped apertures and blocks (for example, electron-beam cutouts and lung blocks) for medical radiation treatment, and making casts of keys that are hard to otherwise duplicate.

Like other fusible alloys, e.g. Rose's metal, Wood's metal can be used as a heat-transfer medium in hot baths. Hot baths with Rose's and Wood's metals are not used routinely but are employed at temperatures above 220 °C (428 °F).

At room temperature, Wood's metal has a modulus of elasticity of 12.7 GPa and a yield strength of 26.2 MPa.

== Toxicity ==
Wood's metal is toxic because it contains lead and cadmium, and contamination of bare skin is considered harmful. Vapour from cadmium-containing alloys is also known to pose a danger to humans. Cadmium poisoning carries the risk of cancer, anosmia (loss of sense of smell), and damage to the liver, kidneys, nerves, bones, and respiratory system. Field's metal is a non-toxic alternative.

The dust may form flammable mixtures with air.

== Related alloys ==
Alloy	Melting point	Eutectic?	Bismuth %	Lead %	Tin %	Indium %	Cadmium %	Thallium %	Gallium %	Antimony %
Rose's metal	98 °C (208 °F)	No	50	25	25	—N/a	—N/a	—N/a	—N/a	—N/a
Cerrosafe	74 °C (165 °F)	No	42.5	37.7	11.3	—N/a	8.5	—N/a	—N/a	—N/a
Wood's metal	70 °C (158 °F)	Yes	50	26.7	13.3	—N/a	10	—N/a	—N/a	—N/a
Field's metal	62 °C (144 °F)	Yes	32.5	—N/a	16.5	51	—N/a	—N/a	—N/a	—N/a
Cerrolow 136	58 °C (136 °F)	Yes	49	18	12	21	—N/a	—N/a	—N/a	—N/a
Cerrolow 117	47.2 °C (117 °F)	Yes	44.7	22.6	8.3	19.1	5.3	—N/a	—N/a	—N/a
Bi-Pb-Sn-Cd-In-Tl	41.5 °C (107 °F)	Yes	40.3	22.2	10.7	17.7	8.1	1.1	—N/a	—N/a
Gallium	29.8 °C (86 °F)	Pure metal	—N/a	—N/a	—N/a	—N/a	—N/a	—N/a	100	—N/a
Galinstan	−19 °C (−2 °F)	No	<1.5	—N/a	9.5–10.5	21–22	—N/a	—N/a	68–69	<1.5

== Bibliography ==
- Birchon's Dictionary of Metallurgy, London, 1965
- Experimental techniques in low-temperature physics, G. K. White, Oxford University Press, Third Edition
