= Galinstan =

Alloy that is liquid at room temperature

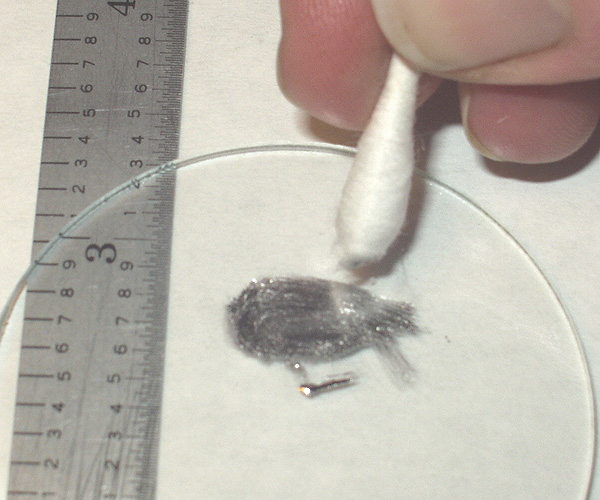
- Galinstan from a broken thermometer wetting a disc of glass

Physical properties
- Density (ρ): 6.44 g/cm^{3} (at 20 °C)

Thermal properties
- Melting temperature (T_{m}): −19 °C (−2 °F)
- Specific heat capacity (c): 296 J·kg^{−1}·K^{−1}

Galinstan is a brand name for an alloy composed of gallium, indium, and tin which melts at −19 °C (−2 °F) and is thus liquid at room temperature. In scientific literature, galinstan is also used to denote the eutectic alloy of gallium, indium, and tin, which melts at around +11 °C (52 °F). The commercial product Galinstan is not a eutectic alloy, but a near-eutectic alloy. Additionally, it likely has added flux to improve flowability, to reduce melting temperature, and to reduce surface tension.

Eutectic galinstan is composed of 68.5% Ga, 21.5% In, and 10.0% Sn (by mass).

Due to the low toxicity and low reactivity of its component metals, galinstan has replaced the toxic liquid mercury or the reactive sodium–potassium alloy in many applications such as bulb thermometers and high-temperature heat exchangers.

== Name ==
The name "galinstan" is a portmanteau of gallium, indium, and stannum (Latin for "tin"). The brand name "Galinstan" is a registered trademark of the German company Geratherm.

== Physical properties ==
- Boiling point: > 1300 °C
- Vapour pressure: < 10^{−8} Torr (at 500 °C)
- Solubility: Insoluble in water or organic solvents
- Viscosity: 0.0024 Pa·s (at 20 °C)
- Thermal conductivity: 16.5 W·m^{−1}·K^{−1}
- Electrical conductivity: 3.46×10^{6} S/m (at 20 °C)
- Surface tension: s = 0.535–0.718 N/m (at 20 °C, dependent on producer)
- Density: 6.44 g/cm3 (at 20 °C)

In the presence of oxygen at concentrations above 1 ppm, the surface of bulk galinstan oxidizes to Ga_{2}O_{3}. Unlike mercury, galinstan tends to wet and adheres to many materials, including glass, due to its surface oxide. This can limit its use as a direct replacement material in some situations, but can also be utilized in some situations.

== History ==
Galinstan was invented and patented by researchers at the German medical technology company Geraberger Thermometerwerk GmbH (now known as Geratherm Medical AG) in 1992..

The alloy was awarded a gold medal for the best new invention at the "Eureka" Inventors' Fair in Brussels in 1993 .

== Uses ==
Galinstan can replace mercury in thermometers at moderate temperatures.

Galinstan has higher reflectivity and lower density than mercury. In astronomy, it can replace mercury in liquid-mirror telescopes.

Metals or alloys like galinstan that are liquids at room temperature are often used by overclockers and enthusiasts as a thermal interface for computer hardware cooling, where their higher thermal conductivity compared to thermal pastes and thermal epoxies can allow slightly higher clock speeds and CPU processing power achieved in demonstrations and competitive overclocking. Two examples are Thermal Grizzly Conductonaut and Coolaboratory Liquid Ultra, with thermal conductivities of 73 and 38.4 W/mK respectively. Unlike ordinary thermal compounds which are easy to apply and present a low risk of damaging hardware, galinstan is electrically conductive and causes liquid metal embrittlement in many metals including aluminium which is commonly used in heatsinks. Despite these challenges the users who are successful with their application do report good results. In August 2020, Sony Interactive Entertainment patented a galinstan-based thermal interface solution suitable for mass production, for use on the PlayStation 5.

Galinstan is difficult to use for cooling fission-based nuclear reactors because indium has a high absorption cross section for thermal neutrons, efficiently absorbing them and inhibiting the fission reaction. Conversely, it is being investigated as a possible coolant for fusion reactors, where absorption of thermal neutrons is not critical to sustaining the reaction.

The wetting characteristics of galinstan can be utilized to fabricate conductive patterns, allowing it to be used as a liquid, deformable conductor in soft robotics and stretchable electronics. Galinstan can be used to replace wires, interconnects, and electrodes as well as the conductive element in inductor coils and dielectric composites for soft capacitors.

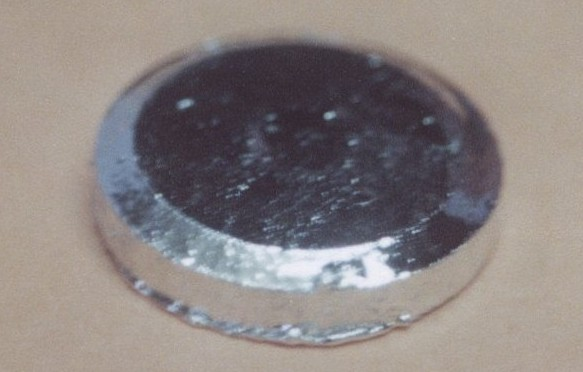
Composite liquid-metal contact (CLMC) based on galinstan-impregnated refractory metal framework

Galinstan is also being investigated as the active material in composite liquid-metal contacts (CLMC) for high-current switching applications. In such contacts, galinstan impregnates a porous framework of refractory metal (molybdenum, tungsten, or rhenium), forming a continuous conductive surface covering up to 98% of the contact cross-section. The elastic framework acts as a damper upon closing, eliminating contact bounce and associated electromagnetic interference. Heat losses are approximately 20 times lower than in silver contacts. Because the contact surface is liquid, electrodynamic repulsion forces during short-circuit currents are practically zero — experimentally confirmed at currents up to 45 kA DC without contact separation, whereas copper contacts were repelled at 10 kA. The manufacturing process is protected by a US patent.

=== X-ray equipment ===
Extremely high-intensity sources may be obtained with an X-ray source that uses a liquid-metal galinstan anode of 9.25 keV X-rays (gallium K-alpha line) for X-ray phase microscopy of fixed tissue (such as mouse brain), from a focal spot about 10 μm × 10 μm, and 3-D voxels of about one cubic micrometer. The metal flows from a nozzle downward at a high speed, and the high-intensity electron source is focused upon it. The rapid flow of metal carries current, but the physical flow prevents a great deal of anode heating (due to forced-convective heat removal), and the high boiling point of galinstan inhibits vaporization of the anode.

== See also ==
- Field's metal, has a table of low melting point alloys
- Rose's metal
- Wood's metal

== Sources ==
- Scharmann, F.; Cherkashinin, G.; Breternitz, V.; Knedlik, Ch.; Hartung, G.; Weber, Th.; Schaefer, J. A. (2004). "Viscosity effect on GaInSn studied by XPS". Surface and Interface Analysis. 36 (8): 981. doi:10.1002/sia.1817. S2CID 97592885.
- Dickey, Michael D.; Chiechi, Ryan C.; Larsen, Ryan J.; Weiss, Emily A.; Weitz, David A.; Whitesides, George M. (2008). "Eutectic Gallium-Indium (EGaIn): A Liquid Metal Alloy for the Formation of Stable Structures in Microchannels at Room Temperature". Advanced Functional Materials. 18 (7): 1097. doi:10.1002/adfm.200701216. S2CID 538906.
