= Eutectic system =

Mixture with a lower melting point than its constituents

A phase diagram for a fictitious binary chemical mixture (with the two components denoted by A and B) used to depict the eutectic composition, temperature, and point. (L denotes the liquid state.)

A eutectic system or eutectic mixture (/juːˈtɛktɪk/ yoo-TEK-tik) is a type of a homogeneous mixture that has a melting point lower than those of the constituents. The lowest possible melting point over all of the mixing ratios of the constituents is called the eutectic temperature. On a phase diagram, the eutectic temperature is seen as the eutectic point (see plot).

Non-eutectic mixture ratios have different melting temperatures for their different constituents, since one component's lattice will melt at a lower temperature than the other's. Conversely, as a non-eutectic mixture cools down, each of its components solidifies into a lattice at a different temperature, until the entire mass is solid. A non-eutectic mixture thus does not have a single melting/freezing point temperature at which it changes phase, but rather a temperature at which it changes between liquid and slush (known as the liquidus) and a lower temperature at which it changes between slush and solid (the solidus).

In the real world, eutectic properties can be used to advantage in such processes as eutectic bonding, where silicon chips are bonded to gold-plated substrates with ultrasound, and eutectic alloys prove valuable in such diverse applications as soldering, brazing, metal casting, electrical protection, fire sprinkler systems, and nontoxic mercury substitutes.

The term eutectic was coined in 1884 by the British physicist and chemist Frederick Guthrie (1833–1886). The word originates from Greek εὐ- (eû) 'well' and τῆξῐς (têxis) 'melting'. Before his studies, chemists assumed "that the alloy of minimum fusing point must have its constituents in some simple atomic proportions", but he showed that that is not always true.

== Eutectic phase transition ==
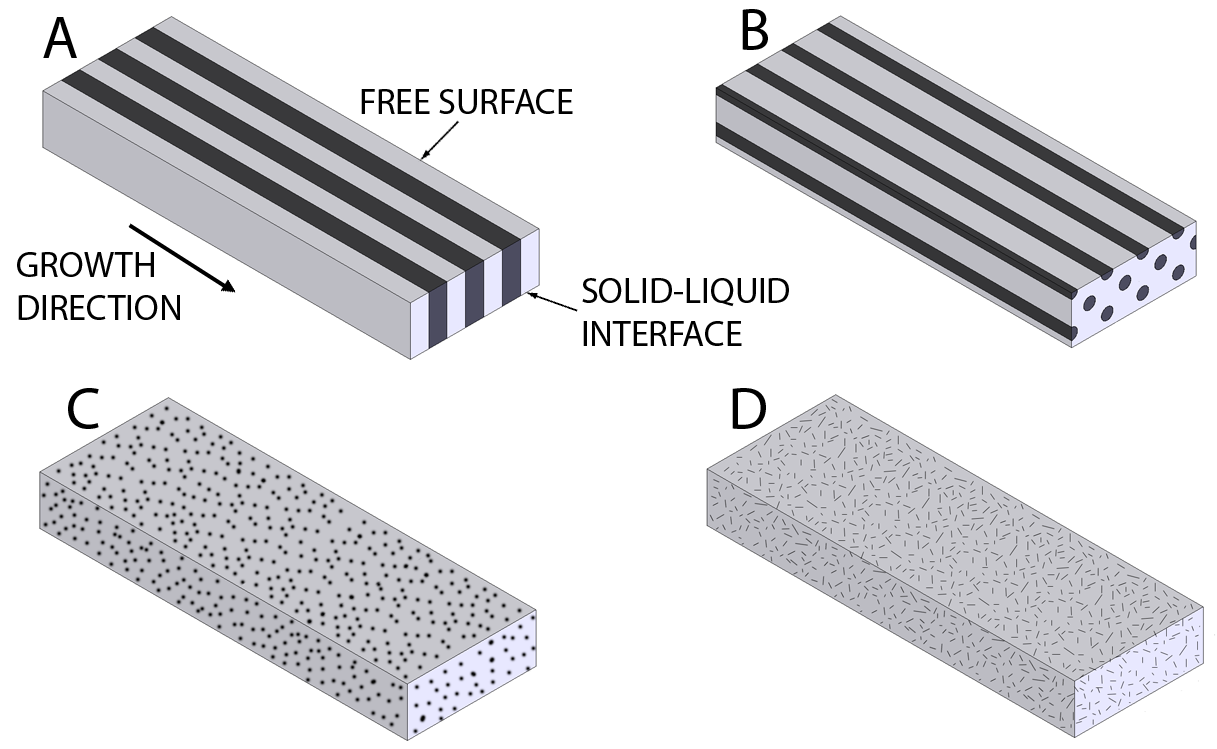
Four eutectic structures: A) lamellar B) rod-like C) globular D) acicular.

The eutectic solidification is defined as follows:

$$\text{Liquid} \quad \xrightarrow[\text{cooling}]{\text{eutectic} \atop \text{temperature}} \quad \alpha \text{ solid solution} \ + \ \beta \text{ solid solution}$$

This type of reaction is an invariant reaction, because it is in thermal equilibrium; another way to define this is the change in Gibbs free energy equals zero. Tangibly, this means the liquid and two solid solutions all coexist at the same time and are in chemical equilibrium. There is also a thermal arrest for the duration of the phase change during which the temperature of the system does not change.

The resulting solid macrostructure from a eutectic reaction depends on a few factors, with the most important factor being how the two solid solutions nucleate and grow. The most common structure is a lamellar structure, but other possible structures include rodlike, globular, and acicular. Besides, a vermicular microstructure has been observed in a high-entropy alloy.

== Non-eutectic compositions ==
Compositions of eutectic systems that are not at the eutectic point can be classified as hypoeutectic or hypereutectic:

- Hypoeutectic compositions are those with a greater composition of species α and a smaller percent composition of species β than the eutectic composition (E)
- Hypereutectic compositions are characterized as those with a higher composition of species β and a lower composition of species α than the eutectic composition.

As the temperature of a non-eutectic composition is lowered the liquid mixture will precipitate one component of the mixture before the other. In a hypereutectic solution, there will be a proeutectoid phase of species β whereas a hypoeutectic solution will have a proeutectic α phase.

== Types ==
=== Alloys ===
Eutectic alloys have two or more materials and have a eutectic composition. When a non-eutectic alloy solidifies, its components solidify at different temperatures, exhibiting a plastic melting range. Conversely, when a well-mixed, eutectic alloy melts, it does so at a single, sharp temperature. The various phase transformations that occur during the solidification of a particular alloy composition can be understood by drawing a vertical line from the liquid phase to the solid phase on the phase diagram for that alloy.

Some uses for eutectic alloys include:

- NEMA eutectic alloy overload relays for electrical protection of three-phase motors for pumps, fans, conveyors, and other factory process equipment.
- Eutectic alloys for soldering, both traditional alloys composed of lead (Pb) and tin (Sn), sometimes with additional silver (Ag) or gold (Au) — especially Sn_{63}Pb_{37} and Sn_{62}Pb_{36}Ag_{2} alloy formula for electronics - and newer lead-free soldering alloys, in particular ones composed of tin, silver, and copper (Cu) such as Sn_{96.5}Ag_{3.5}.
- Casting alloys, such as aluminium-silicon and cast iron (at the composition of 4.3% carbon in iron producing an austenite-cementite eutectic)
- Silicon chips are eutectic bonded to gold-plated substrates through a silicon-gold eutectic by the application of ultrasonic energy to the chip.
- Brazing, where diffusion can remove alloying elements from the joint, so that eutectic melting is only possible early in the brazing process
- Temperature response, e.g., Wood's metal and Field's metal for fire sprinklers
- Non-toxic mercury replacements, such as galinstan
- Experimental glassy metals, with extremely high strength and corrosion resistance
- Eutectic alloys of sodium and potassium (NaK) that are liquid at room temperature and used as coolant in experimental fast neutron nuclear reactors.

=== Others ===
Solid–liquid phase change of ethanol–water mixtures

- Salts and water form eutectic systems. Magnesium perchlorate has a eutectic point of −64 °C (−83 °F). Sodium chloride and water form a eutectic mixture whose eutectic point is −21.2 °C (−6.2 °F) and 23.3% salt by mass. The eutectic nature of salt and water is exploited when salt is spread on roads to aid snow removal, or mixed with ice to produce low temperatures (for example, in traditional ice cream making).
- Ethanol–water has an unusually biased eutectic point, i.e. it is close to pure ethanol, which sets the maximum proof obtainable by fractional freezing.
- "Solar salt", 60% NaNO_{3} and 40% KNO_{3}, which is used for thermal energy storage in concentrated solar power plants, forms a eutectic molten salt mixture with a melting point of 221 °C (430 °F). To reduce the eutectic melting point further, a ternary mixture of 42% calcium nitrate (Ca(NO_{3})_{2}), 43% KNO_{3} and 15% NaNO_{3} with a melting point of 140 °C (284 °F) may be used.
- Lidocaine and prilocaine—both are solids at room temperature—form a eutectic that is an oil with a 16 °C (61 °F) melting point that is used in eutectic mixture of local anesthetic (EMLA) preparations.
- Menthol and camphor, both solids at room temperature, form a eutectic that is a liquid at room temperature in the following proportions: 8:2, 7:3, 6:4, and 5:5. Both substances are common ingredients in pharmacy extemporaneous preparations.
- Minerals may form eutectic mixtures in igneous rocks, giving rise to characteristic intergrowth textures exhibited, for example, by granophyre.
- Choline chloride produces eutectic mixtures with many natural products such as citric acid, malic acid and sugars. These liquid mixtures can be used, for example, to obtain antioxidant and antidiabetic extracts from natural products.

== Strengthening mechanisms ==
=== Alloys ===
The primary strengthening mechanism of the eutectic structure in metals is composite strengthening (See strengthening mechanisms of materials). This deformation mechanism works through load transfer between the two constituent phases where the more compliant phase transfers stress to the stiffer phase. By taking advantage of the strength of the stiff phase and the ductility of the compliant phase, the overall toughness of the material increases. As the composition is varied to either hypoeutectic or hypereutectic formations, the load transfer mechanism becomes more complex as there is a load transfer between the eutectic phase and the secondary phase as well as the load transfer within the eutectic phase itself.

A second tunable strengthening mechanism of eutectic structures is the spacing of the secondary phase. By changing the spacing of the secondary phase, the fraction of contact between the two phases through shared phase boundaries is also changed. By decreasing the spacing of the eutectic phase, creating a fine eutectic structure, more surface area is shared between the two constituent phases resulting in more effective load transfer. On the micro-scale, the additional boundary area acts as a barrier to dislocations further strengthening the material. As a result of this strengthening mechanism, coarse eutectic structures tend to be less stiff but more ductile while fine eutectic structures are stiffer but more brittle. The spacing of the eutectic phase can be controlled during processing as it is directly related to the cooling rate during solidification of the eutectic structure. For example, for a simple lamellar eutectic structure, the minimal lamellae spacing is:

$\lambda^*=\frac{2\gamma V_m T_E }{\Delta H * \Delta T_0}$

Where is $\gamma$ is the surface energy of the two-phase boundary, $V_m$ is the molar volume of the eutectic phase, $T_E$ is the solidification temperature of the eutectic phase, $\Delta H$ is the enthalpy of formation of the eutectic phase, and $\Delta T_0$ is the undercooling of the material. So, by altering the undercooling, and by extension the cooling rate, the minimal achievable spacing of the secondary phase is controlled.

Strengthening metallic eutectic phases to resist deformation at high temperatures (see creep deformation) is more convoluted as the primary deformation mechanism changes depending on the level of stress applied. At high temperatures where deformation is dominated by dislocation movement, the strengthening from load transfer and secondary phase spacing remain as they continue to resist dislocation motion. At lower strains where Nabarro-Herring creep is dominant, the shape and size of the eutectic phase structure plays a significant role in material deformation as it affects the available boundary area for vacancy diffusion to occur.

== Other critical points ==
Iron–carbon phase diagram, showing the eutectoid transformation between austenite (γ) and pearlite.

=== Eutectoid ===
When the solution above the transformation point is solid, rather than liquid, an analogous eutectoid transformation can occur. For instance, in the iron-carbon system, the austenite phase can undergo a eutectoid transformation to produce ferrite and cementite, often in lamellar structures such as pearlite and bainite. This eutectoid point occurs at 723 °C (1,333 °F) and 0.76 wt% carbon.

=== Peritectoid ===
A peritectoid transformation is a type of isothermal reversible reaction that has two solid phases reacting with each other upon cooling of a binary, ternary, ..., n-ary alloy to create a completely different and single solid phase. The reaction plays a key role in the order and decomposition of quasicrystalline phases in several alloy types. A similar structural transition is also predicted for rotating columnar crystals.

=== Peritectic ===
Gold–aluminium phase diagram

Peritectic transformations are also similar to eutectic reactions. Here, a liquid and solid phase of fixed proportions react at a fixed temperature to yield a single solid phase. Since the solid product forms at the interface between the two reactants, it can form a diffusion barrier and generally causes such reactions to proceed much more slowly than eutectic or eutectoid transformations. Because of this, when a peritectic composition solidifies it does not show the lamellar structure that is found with eutectic solidification.

Such a transformation exists in the iron-carbon system, as seen near the upper-left corner of the figure. It resembles an inverted eutectic, with the δ phase combining with the liquid to produce pure austenite at 1,495 °C (2,723 °F) and 0.17% carbon.

At the peritectic decomposition temperature the compound, rather than melting, decomposes into another solid compound and a liquid. The proportion of each is determined by the lever rule. In the Al-Au phase diagram, for example, it can be seen that only two of the phases melt congruently, AuAl_{2} and Au_{2}Al, while the rest peritectically decompose.

=== "Bad solid solution" ===
Not all minimum melting point systems are "eutectic". The alternative of "poor solid solution" can be illustrated by comparing the common precious metal systems Cu-Ag and Cu-Au. Cu-Ag, source for example https://himikatus.ru/art/phase-diagr1/Ag-Cu.php, is a true eutectic system. The eutectic melting point is at 780 °C, with solid solubility limits at fineness 80 and 912 by weight, and eutectic at 719. Since Cu-Ag is a true eutectic, any silver with fineness anywhere between 80 and 912 will reach solidus line, and therefore melt at least partly, at exactly 780 °C. The eutectic alloy with fineness exactly 719 will reach liquidus line, and therefore melt entirely, at that exact temperature without any further rise of temperature till all of the alloy has melted. Any silver with fineness between 80 and 912 but not exactly 719 will also reach the solidus line at exactly 780 °C, but will melt partly. It will leave a solid residue with fineness of either exactly 912 or exactly 80, but never some of both. It will melt at constant temperature without further rise of temperature until the exact amount of eutectic (fineness 719) alloy has melted off to divide the alloy into eutectic melt and solid solution residue. On further heating, the solid solution residue dissolves in the melt and changes its composition until the liquidus line is reached and the whole residue has dissolved away. Cu-Au source for example https://himikatus.ru/art/phase-diagr1/Au-Cu.php does display a melting point minimum at 910 °C and given as 44 atom % Cu, which converts to about 20 weight percent Cu - about 800 fineness of gold. But this is not a true eutectic. 800 fine gold melts at 910 °C, to a melt of the same composition, and the whole alloy will melt at the same temperature. But the differences happen away from the minimum composition. Unlike silver with fineness other than 719 (which melts partly at exactly 780 °C through a wide fineness range), gold with fineness other than 800 will reach solidus and start partial melting at a temperature different from and higher than 910 °C, depending on the alloy fineness. The partial melting does cause some composition changes - the liquid will be closer in fineness towards 800 than the remaining solid, but the liquid will not have fineness of exactly 800 and the fineness of the remaining solid will depend on the fineness of the liquid. The underlying reason is that for an eutectic system like Cu-Ag, the solubility in liquid phase is good but solubility in solid phase is limited. Therefore when a silver-copper alloy is frozen, it actually separates into crystals of 912 fineness silver and 80 fineness silver - both are saturated and always have the same composition at the freezing point of 780 °C. Thus the alloy just below 780 °C consists of two types of crystals of exactly the same composition regardless of the total alloy composition, only the relative amount of each type of crystals differs. Therefore they always melt at 780 °C until one or other type of crystals, or both, will be exhausted. In contrast, in Cu-Au system the components are miscible at the melting point in all compositions even in solid. There can be crystals of any composition, which will melt at different temperatures depending on composition. However, Cu-Au system is a "poor" solid solution. There is a substantial misfit between the atoms in solid which, however, near the melting point is overcome by entropy of thermal motion mixing the atoms. That misfit, however, disfavours the Cu-Au solution relative to phases in which the atoms are better fitted, such as the melt, and causes the melting point to fall below the melting point of components.

== Eutectic calculation ==
The composition and temperature of a eutectic can be calculated from enthalpy and entropy of fusion of each component.

The Gibbs free energy G depends on its own differential:

$$G = H - TS
\Rightarrow
\begin{cases}
H = G + TS \\
\left(\frac{\partial G}{\partial T}\right)_P = -S
\end{cases}
\Rightarrow
H = G - T \left(\frac{\partial G}{\partial T}\right)_P.$$

Thus, the G/T derivative at constant pressure is calculated by the following equation:

$$\left(\frac{\partial G / T}{\partial T}\right)_P
=
\frac{1}{T} \left(\frac{\partial G}{\partial T}\right)_P - \frac{1}{T^2}G
=
-\frac{1}{T^2} \left(G - T\left(\frac{\partial G}{\partial T}\right)_P\right)
= -\frac{H}{T^2}.$$

The chemical potential $\mu_i$ is calculated if we assume that the activity is equal to the concentration:

$$\mu_i = \mu_i^\circ + RT\ln \frac{a_i}{a} \approx \mu_i^\circ + RT\ln x_i.$$

At the equilibrium, $\mu_i = 0$, thus $\mu_i^\circ$ is obtained as

$$\mu _i = \mu _i^\circ + RT\ln x_i = 0 \Rightarrow \mu_i^\circ = -RT\ln x_i.$$

Using and integrating gives

$$\left(\frac{\partial \mu_i / T}{\partial T}\right)_P =
\frac{\partial}{\partial T}\left(R\ln x_i\right) \Rightarrow
R\ln x_i =
-\frac{H_i^\circ}{T} + K.$$

The integration constant K may be determined for a pure component with a melting temperature $T^\circ$ and an enthalpy of fusion $H^\circ$:

$$x_i = 1 \Rightarrow T = T_i^\circ \Rightarrow K = \frac{H_i^\circ}{T_i^\circ}.$$

We obtain a relation that determines the molar fraction as a function of the temperature for each component:

$$R\ln x_i = -\frac{H_i^\circ}{T} + \frac{H_i^\circ}{T_i^\circ}.$$

The mixture of n components is described by the system

$$\begin{cases}
\ln x_i + \frac{H_i^\circ}{RT} - \frac{H_i^\circ}{RT_i^\circ } = 0, \\
\sum\limits_{i = 1}^n x_i = 1.
\end{cases}$$
$$\begin{cases}
\forall i < n \Rightarrow \ln x_i + \frac{H_i^\circ}{RT} - \frac{H_i^\circ}{RT_i^\circ} = 0, \\
\ln \left(1 - \sum\limits_{i = 1}^{n - 1} x_i\right) + \frac{H_n^\circ}{RT} - \frac{H_n^\circ}{RT_n^\circ} = 0,
\end{cases}$$

which can be solved by

$$\begin{array}{c}
\left[ {{\begin{array}{*{20}c}
{\Delta x_1 } \\
{\Delta x_2 } \\
{\Delta x_3 } \\
\vdots \\
{\Delta x_{n - 1} } \\
{\Delta T} \\
\end{array} }} \right] \ =\  \left[ {{\begin{array}{*{20}c}
{1 / x_1 } & 0 & 0 & 0 & 0 & { - \frac{H_1^\circ }{RT^{2}}} \\
0 & {1 / x_2 } & 0 & 0 & 0 & { - \frac{H_2^\circ }{RT^{2}}} \\
0 & 0 & {1 / x_3 } & 0 & 0 & { - \frac{H_3^\circ }{RT^{2}}} \\
\vdots & \ddots & \ddots & \ddots & \ddots & { \vdots} \\
0 & 0 & 0 & 0 & {1 / x_{n - 1} } & { - \frac{H_{n - 1}^\circ }{RT^{2}}}
\\
{\frac{ - 1}{1 - \sum\limits_{i = 1}^{n - 1} {x_i } }} & {\frac{ - 1}{1 -
\sum\limits_{i = 1}^{n - 1} {x_i } }} & {\frac{ - 1}{1 -
\sum\limits_{i = 1}^{n - 1} {x_i } }} & {\frac{ - 1}{1 -
\sum\limits_{i = 1}^{n - 1} {x_i } }} & {\frac{ - 1}{1 -
\sum\limits_{i = 1}^{n - 1} {x_i } }} & { -
\frac{H_n^\circ }{RT^{2}}} \\
\end{array} }} \right]^{ - 1}
\!\cdot\ \ \left[ {{\begin{array}{*{20}c}
{\ln x_1 + \frac{H_1 ^\circ }{RT} - \frac{H_1^\circ }{RT_1^\circ }}
\\
{\ln x_2 + \frac{H_2 ^\circ }{RT} - \frac{H_2^\circ }{RT_2^\circ }}
\\
{\ln x_3 + \frac{H_3 ^\circ }{RT} - \frac{H_3^\circ }{RT_3^\circ }}
\\
\vdots \\
{\ln x_{n - 1} + \frac{H_{n - 1} ^\circ }{RT} - \frac{H_{n - 1}^\circ
}{RT_{n - 1}^\circ }} \\
{\ln \left({1 - \sum\limits_{i = 1}^{n - 1} {x_i } } \right) + \frac{H_n
^\circ }{RT} - \frac{H_n^\circ }{RT_n^\circ }} \\
\end{array} }} \right]
\end{array}$$

== See also ==
- Azeotrope, or constant boiling mixture
- Freezing-point depression
- Fusible alloy
