= Fan-out wafer-level packaging =

Integrated circuit packaging technology

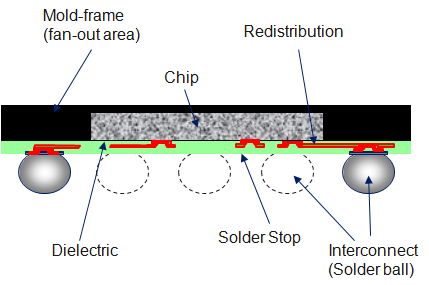
Sketch of the eWLB package, the first commercialized FO-WLP technology

Fan-out wafer-level packaging (also known as wafer-level fan-out packaging, fan-out WLP, FOWL packaging, FO-WLP, FOWLP, etc.) is an integrated circuit packaging technology, and an enhancement of standard wafer-level packaging (WLP) solutions. Fan-out packaging is seen as a low cost advanced packaging alternative to packages that use silicon interposers, such as those seen in 2.5D and 3D packages.

In conventional technologies, a wafer is diced first, and then individual dies are packaged; package size is usually considerably larger than the die size. By contrast, in standard WLP flows integrated circuits are packaged while still part of the wafer, and the wafer (with outer layers of packaging already attached) is diced afterwards; the resulting package is practically of the same size as the die itself. However, the advantage of having a small package comes with a downside of limiting the number of external contacts that can be accommodated in the limited package footprint; this may become a significant limitation when complex semiconductor devices requiring a large number of contacts are considered.

Fan-out WLP was developed to relax that limitation. It provides a smaller package footprint along with improved thermal and electrical performance compared to conventional packages, and allows having higher number of contacts without increasing the die size.

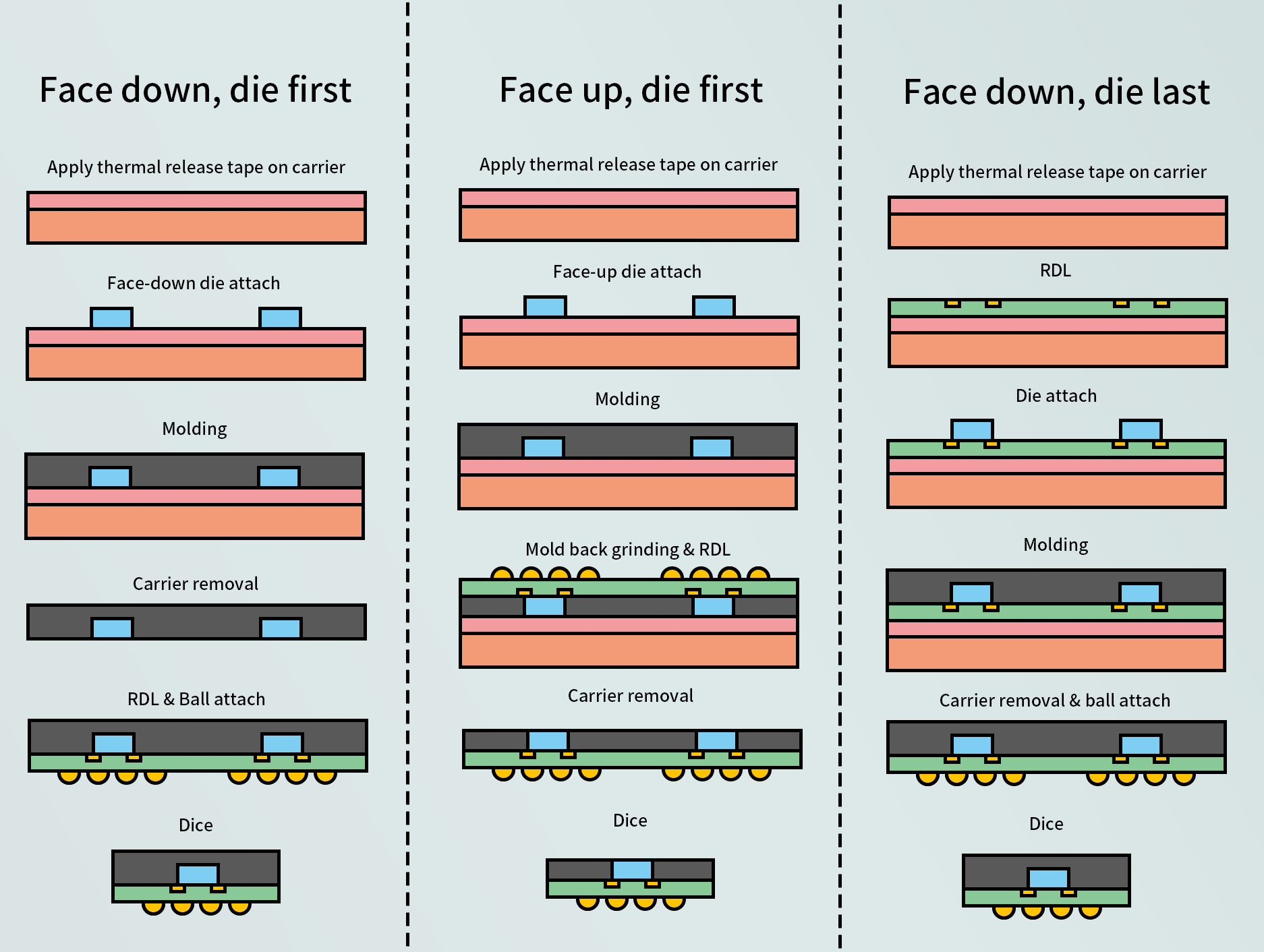
There are three process approaches used in FOWLP: face down, die first; face up, die first; face down die last.

In contrast to standard WLP flows, in fan-out WLP the wafer is diced first. But then the dies are very precisely re-positioned on a carrier wafer or panel, with space for fan-out kept around each die. The carrier is then reconstituted by molding, followed by making a redistribution layer atop the entire molded area (both atop the chip and atop the adjacent fan-out area), and then forming solder balls on top and dicing the wafer. This is known as a chip-first flow. Panel level packaging uses a large panel instead of a wafer to carry out the packaging process. High end fan-out packages are those with lines and spaces narrower than 8 microns. Fan-out packages can also have several dies, and passive components. The first fan-out packages were developed by Infineon in the mid-2000s for use in mobile phone chips.

== See also ==
- List of electronic component packaging types
