= Amkor Technology =

American semiconductor company

Amkor Technology, Inc.
- Type: Public
- Traded as: Nasdaq: AMKR; S&P 400 component
- ISIN: US0316521006
- Industry: Semiconductors & Related Devices
- Founded: 1968; 58 years ago
- Founder: Hyang-Soo Kim
- Headquarters: Tempe, Arizona, U.S.
- Number of locations: 12
- Key people: Joo-Jin (James) Kim (executive chairman); John T. Kim; (executive vice chairman); Kevin Engel (president & CEO); Megan Faust; (corporate VP & CFO)
- Revenue: ▼US$6.50 billion (2023)
- Operating income: ▼US$470 million (2023)
- Net income: ▼US$362 million (2023)
- Total assets: ▼US$6.77 billion (2023)
- Total equity: ▲US$3.96 billion (2023)
- Number of employees: 28,700 (2023)
- Website: amkor.com

Amkor Technology, Inc. is an American semiconductor product packaging and test services provider. The company has been headquartered in Arizona since 2005, when it was moved from West Chester, Pennsylvania, also in the United States. The company's Arizona headquarters was originally in Chandler, then later moved to Tempe. The company was founded in 1968 and, as of 2022, has approximately 31,000 employees worldwide and a reported $7.1 billion in sales.

With factories in China, Japan, Korea, Malaysia, Philippines, Portugal, Taiwan and Vietnam, Amkor is a major player in the semiconductor industry. It designs, packages and tests integrated circuits (ICs) for chip manufacturers.

== Etymology ==
Amkor self-publishes that the name "Amkor" is a portmanteau of the words "America" and "Korea".

== History ==
Amkor's origins can be traced back to ANAM Industries, a business in Seoul dealing with imported Japanese goods, including bicycles, and founded by Hyang-Soo Kim in 1935. In March 1968, ANAM Industries underwent a transformation into ANAM Industrial Co. Ltd., becoming South Korea's first semiconductor business. One month later, his son Joo-Jin (James) Kim founded Amkor Electronics, Inc. and inaugurated its sales office in Philadelphia. Its semiconductor production and export began in 1970. In 1998, Amkor began publicly trading on Nasdaq.

In 2000, Amkor acquired Integra Technologies, an Outsourced Semiconductor Assembly And Test (OSAT) provider in the United States. In 2005, Amkor spun off Integra Technologies.

In February 2016, Amkor fully acquired J-Devices Corp, the largest Outsourced Semiconductor Assembly And Test (OSAT) provider in Japan.

In June 2017, Amkor Technology was recognized as Supplier of the Year for 2016 by Qualcomm Technologies for a second consecutive year.

Amkor Technology has competitiveness for chip assembly by thermal compression as well as wafer level packaging. In September 2018, Amkor Technology opened a manufacturing and test plant at Longtan Science Park in Taiwan.

In 2019, Amkor Technology was ranked 2nd in overall revenue in the OSAT (Outsourced Semiconductor Assembly and Test) market.

- ASE Technology – $11.87 Billion
- Amkor Technology – $7.1 Billion
- JCET – $3.97 Billion
- SPIL – $2.79 Billion
- Powertech Technology – $2.17 Billion

A $2 billion factory for advanced packaging of chips from TSMC in Arizona was announced in November 2023. In late August 2025, the location for the facility was shifted to the Peoria Innovation Core after the city of Peoria acquired land for the project.

== Products ==
Amkor's designs, packages and tests semiconductors for other companies. The company's offers include RF-antenna designs incorporated directly into or onto a chip, CMOS imaging sensors or flip chip packaging with copper pillar bumps. Amkor also offers wire bonding of semiconductors to packages as well as a technology to prevent edge gaps and cracks on semiconductor packaging called "Edge Protection".

== See also ==
- Semiconductor industry
- Integrated circuit packaging
- Wafer-level packaging
- System in a package
