= Dye-and-pry =

Analysis of electronic circuit connections

Dye-n-Pry, also called Dye And Pry, Dye and Pull, Dye Staining, or Dye Penetrant, is a destructive analysis technique used on surface mount technology (SMT) components to either perform failure analysis or inspect for solder joint integrity. It is an application of dye penetrant inspection.

== Method ==
Dye-n-Pry is a useful technique in which a dye penetrant material is used to inspect for interconnect failures in integrated circuits (ICs). This is mostly done on solder joints for ball grid array (BGA) components, although in some cases it can be done with other components or samples. The component of interest is submerged in a dye material, such as red steel dye, and placed under vacuum. This allows the dye to flow underneath the component and into any cracks or defects. The dye is then dried in an oven (preferably overnight) to prevent smearing during separation, which could lead to false results. The part of interest is mechanically separated from the printed circuit board (PCB) and inspected for the presence of dye. Any fracture surface or interface will have dye present, indicating the presence of cracks or open circuits. IPC-TM-650 Method 2.4.53 specifies a process for dye-n-pry.

== Use in failure analysis of electronics ==
Dye-n-Pry is a useful failure analysis technique to detect cracking or open circuits in BGA solder joints. This has some practical advantages over other destructive techniques, such as cross sectioning, as it can inspect a full ball grid array which may consist of hundreds of solder joints. Cross sectioning, on the other hand, may only be able to inspect a single row of solder joints and requires a better initial idea of the failure site.

Dye-n-pry can be useful for detecting several different failure modes. This includes pad cratering or solder joint fracture from mechanical drop/shock, thermal shock, or thermal cycling. This makes it useful technique to incorporate into a reliability test plan as part of the post test failure inspection. It is also a useful method to inspect or diagnose failures due to manufacturing defects or design flaws. This includes defects such as black pad for PCBs with ENIG surface finishes or early failures due to excessive board flexure from depaneling or In-circuit test (ICT).

== See also ==
- Failure of electronic components
- Solder fatigue
