= James Kim (American businessman) =

American businessman

James Joo-Jin Kim is an American businessman who founded the chipmaker Amkor. Kim immigrated to the United States from South Korea in 1955 and started Amkor Electronics as a law student. Kim took the company public in 1998 and stepped down as CEO in 2009, while staying on as the executive chairman of the Board. In 2005, Kim bought out GameStop in a deal valued at $1.4 billion.

== Early life and education ==
Kim was born in South Korea and moved to the United States for his studies. In 1996, he was awarded an honorary doctorate in Economics from Chonnam National University in Gwangju, South Korea.

He and his family have a net worth of US$1.6 billion according to Forbes.
