= Head-in-pillow defect =

Failure of the soldering process on printed circuit boards

In the assembly of integrated circuit packages to printed circuit boards, a head-in-pillow defect (HIP or HNP), also called ball-and-socket, is a failure of the soldering process. For example, in the case of a ball grid array (BGA) package, the pre-deposited solder ball on the package and the solder paste applied to the circuit board may both melt, but the melted solder does not join. A cross-section through the failed joint shows a distinct boundary between the solder ball on the part and the solder paste on the circuit board, rather like a section through a head resting on a pillow.

The defect can be caused by surface oxidation or poor wetting of the solder, or by distortion of the integrated circuit package or circuit board by the heat of the soldering process. This is particularly a concern when using lead-free solder, which requires a higher processing temperature.

The defect can be attributed to a chain of events during soldering. Initially, the ball is in contact with solder paste. During heating, the board and components undergo thermal expansion, can flex, and some of the balls can be lifted off the paste. Oxidation occurs rapidly at elevated temperature, and when the surfaces come in contact again, the residual flux activity may not be sufficient to disrupt the oxide layer. The solder paste composition, eg. flux with higher activation temperature, together with the wetting characteristics of the solder ball, are the most significant mitigation factors.

Since the warping of the circuit board or integrated circuit may disappear when the board cools, an intermittent fault may be created. Diagnosis of head-in-pillow defects may require use of X-rays or EOTPR (Electro Optical Terahertz Pulse Reflectometry), since the solder joints are hidden between the integrated circuit package and the printed circuit board.
