= SEMI font =

Font for marking silicon wafers

SEMI Font, also known as SEMI OCR font, is used for marking silicon wafers in the semi-conductor industry.

The SEMI font character set includes 26 uppercase letters, 10 numbers, and the dash and period. Their shapes and dimensions are specified by SEMI M12/M13 standard, which was approved by Global Traceability Committee and North American Traceability Committee.

When used in "single-density" mode, laser scribers use a dot matrix of 5 dots horizontal and 9 dots vertical, in "double-density" mode, the matrix is 10 dots horizontal and 18 dots vertical.
