= Wafer-level packaging =

Means of packaging an integrated circuit

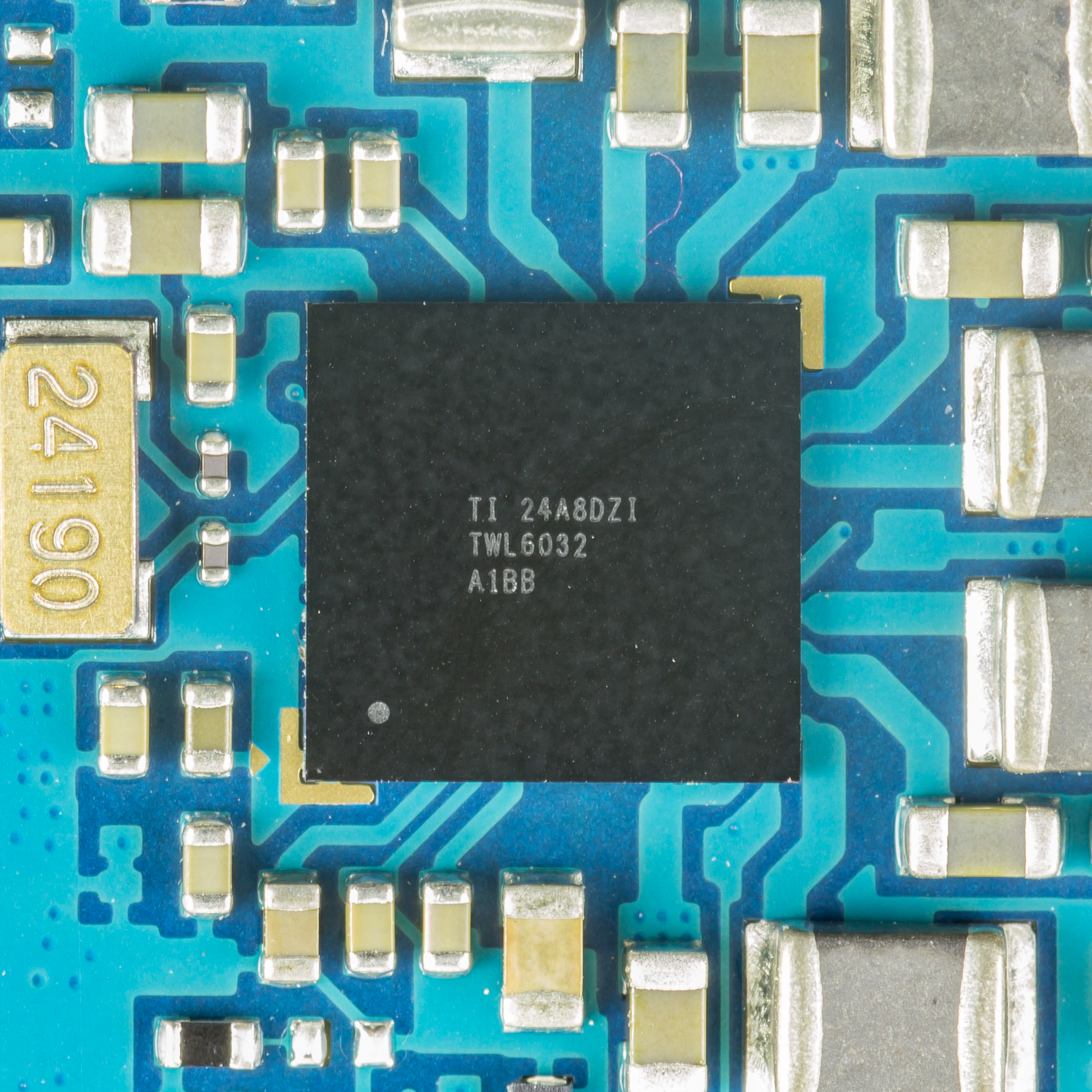
A wafer-level package attached to a printed-circuit board

Wafer-level packaging (WLP) is a process in integrated circuit manufacturing where packaging components are attached to an integrated circuit (IC) before the wafer – on which the IC is fabricated – is diced. In WLP, the top and bottom layers of the packaging and the solder bumps are attached to the integrated circuits while they are still in the wafer. This process differs from a conventional process, in which the wafer is sliced into individual circuits (dice) before the packaging components are attached.

WLP is essentially a true chip-scale package (CSP) technology, since the resulting package is practically of the same size as the die. Wafer-level packaging allows integration of wafer fab, packaging, test, and burn-in at wafer level in order to streamline the manufacturing process undergone by a device from silicon start to customer shipment. As of 2009, there is no single industry-standard method of wafer-level packaging.

A major application area of WLPs is their use in smartphones due to the size constraints. For example, the Apple iPhone 5 has at least eleven different WLPs, the Samsung Galaxy S3 has six WLPs and the HTC One X has seven. Functions provided WLPs in smartphones include sensors, power management, and wireless. The iPhone 7 was rumored to use fan-out wafer-level packaging technology in order to achieve a thinner and lighter model.

Wafer-level chip scale packaging (WL-CSP) is the smallest package currently available on the market and is produced by OSAT (Outsourced Semiconductor Assembly and Test) companies, such as Advanced Semiconductor Engineering (ASE). A WL-CSP or WLCSP package is just a bare die with a redistribution layer (RDL, interposer or I/O pitch) to rearrange the pins or contacts on the die so that they can be big enough and have sufficient spacing so that they can be handled just like a ball grid array (BGA) package. The RDL is often made out of a polyamide or polybenzoxazole with copper plated on its surface.

There are two kinds of wafer level packaging: fan-in and fan-out. Fan-in WLCSP packages have an interposer that is the same size as that of the die, where as fan-out WLCSP packages have an interposer that is larger than the die, similar to conventional BGA packages, the difference being that the interposer is built directly atop the die, instead of the die being attached to it and reflowed using the flip chip method. This is also true in fan-in WLSCP packages. In both cases, the die with its interposer may be covered in encapsulating material such as epoxy. Fan-out packages are used in cases where fan-in packages are not able to provide enough connections at a specified cost.

In February 2015, it was discovered that a WL-CSP chip in the Raspberry Pi 2 had issues with xenon flashes (or any other bright flashes of longwave light), inducing the photoelectric effect within the chip.

== See also ==
- List of electronic component packaging types
- Chip-scale package
- Wafer-scale integration
- Wafer bonding
