= Redistribution layer =

Layer used to relocate a microchip's contacts

A redistribution layer (RDL) is an extra metal layer on an integrated circuit that makes its I/O pads available in other locations of the chip, for better access to the pads where necessary.

When an integrated circuit is manufactured, it usually has a set of I/O pads that are wirebonded to the pins of the package. A redistribution layer is an extra layer of wiring on the chip that enables bond out from different locations on the chip, making chip-to-chip bonding simpler. Another example of the use for RDL is for spreading the contact points around the die so that solder balls can be applied, and the thermal stress of mounting can be spread. The RDL is often made out of a polyamide, benzocyclobutene (BCB) or polybenzoxazole (PBO) with copper plated on its surface. The RDLs that made by the polymer and ECD Cu + etching are called organic RDLs, which made by PECVD and Cu-damascene + CMP are called inorganic RDLs.

== See also ==
- Semiconductor device fabrication
