= Temperature cycling =

Chemical process

Temperature cycling (or thermal cycling, or temperature cycle) is the process of cycling through two temperature extremes, typically at relatively high rates of change. It is an environmental stress test used in evaluating product reliability as well as in manufacturing to catch early-term, latent defects by inducing failure through thermal fatigue.

For machines that are operated at high temperatures, temperature cycling is a regular phenomenon that repeats with every period of use. Due to the repeated switching of the machine’s environment from a low-temperature to a high-temperature environment and back, thermal stresses are generated as a consequence of the repeated expansion and contraction of its material. It can also lead to the severe breakdown or damage of a material over a sufficient quantity of cycles. This is primarily due to the uneven expansion of various materials in a multilayered or composite substrate, due to the differences in thermal expansion coefficients between the constituent materials.

Thermal cycling tests are hence performed to characterize their behavior at various temperatures, inducing thermal stresses on components to verify their performance under temperature extremes, including nonoperating survival temperatures.
