= Solder ball =

Connection method for surface-mounted chips

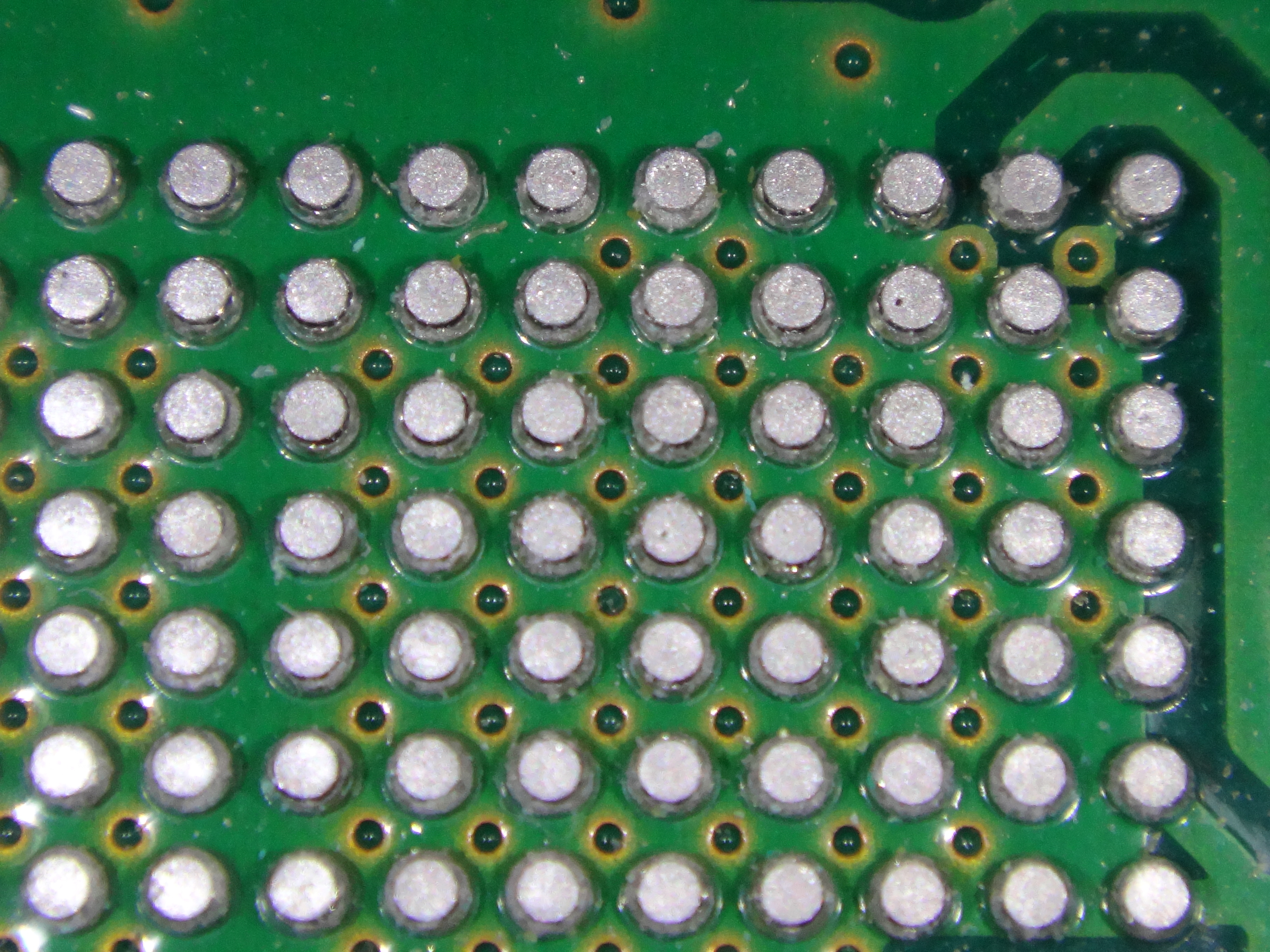
A grid array of solder balls under an integrated circuit chip, with the chip removed; the balls were left attached to the printed circuit board.

A MCM schematic for a stacked DRAM dice showing solder balls

In integrated circuit packaging, a solder ball, also known as a solder bump (often referred to simply as "ball" or "bumps") is a ball of solder that provides the contact between the chip package and the printed circuit board, as well as between stacked packages in multichip modules; in the latter case, they may be referred to as microbumps (μbumps, ubumps), since they are usually significantly smaller than the former. The solder balls can be placed manually or by automated equipment, and are held in place with a tacky flux.

A coined solder ball is a solder ball subject to coining, i.e., flattening to a shape resembling that of a coin, to increase contact reliability.

Ball grid array, chip-scale package, and flip chip packages generally use solder balls.

== Underfill ==
After the solder balls are used to attach an integrated circuit chip to a printed circuit board (PCB), often the remaining air gap between them is underfilled with epoxy.

In some cases, there may be multiple layers of solder balls—for example, one layer of solder balls attaching a flip chip to an interposer to form a BGA package, and a second layer of solder balls attaching that interposer to the PCB. Often both layers are underfilled.

== Usage in flip chip method ==
Pads

Balls

Alignment

Contact

Solder reflow

Adhesive underfill

Final result

== See also ==
- Head-in-pillow defect, a solder ball failure
