= PlayStation Portable hardware =

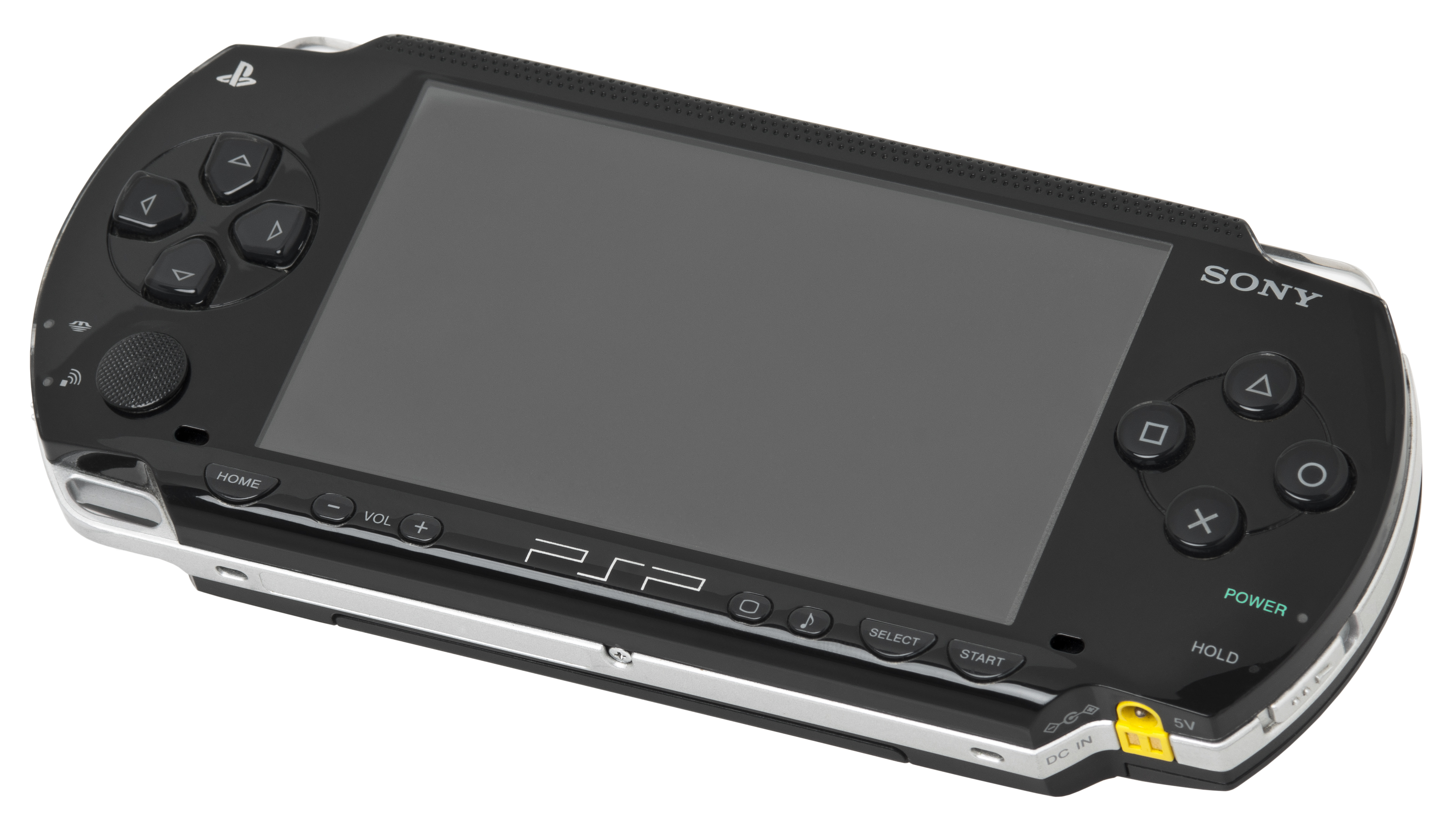
The PSP-1000

The PlayStation Portable's hardware consists of the physical components of the PlayStation Portable (PSP) and its accessories.

== Overview ==
The PSP was designed by Shin'ichi Ogasawara (小笠原伸一) for the Sony Computer Entertainment subsidiary of Sony Corporation. Early models pre-installed with 1.xx firmware were made in Japan but in order to cut costs, Sony has farmed out PSP production to non-Japanese manufacturers, mainly in China for units pre-installed with firmware version 2.00 and above. The unit measures 170 mm (6.7 inches) in length, 74 mm (2.9 inches) in width, and 23 mm (0.9 inches) in depth, and has a mass of 280 grams (9.9 oz or 0.62 lb) including the battery. The Samsung (previously Sharp) branded TFT LCD screen measures 110 mm (4.3 in) diagonal with a 16:9 ratio and a 480×272 pixel resolution capable of 16.77 million colors and has a brightness of up to 115 (battery powered) or 148 cd/m^{2} (AC powered). It has four possible brightness settings, the brightest of which is disabled in all official firmware versions unless on A/C power. Additionally, hidden brightness settings can be enabled when using Custom Firmware.

The PSP uses a drive compatible with Sony's proprietary Universal Media Disc format. Use of the drive increases battery drain by approximately 10% and the system has been criticized for having very slow data transfer speeds, translating into load times of more than two minutes in total for some games. However this has been improved with the redesigned Slim & Lite PSP which has faster loading times, according to GameSpot's "Sony PSP Slim Hands-On Report".

Despite its movie and music playback capabilities, the PSP has primarily gaming-oriented controls (as opposed to the controls typical to television remotes or MP3 players): two shoulder buttons (L and R), the PlayStation, start and select buttons, a digital 4-directional pad, and an analog 'nub' which is slid rather than tilted. There is also a row of secondary controls along the underside of the screen, for controlling volume, music settings (either switching the audio off and on in games or selecting different equalizer presets), screen brightness, and a "Home" button for accessing the system's main menu. Pressing the Home button while doing anything except playing a game will bring up the XMB, which theoretically allows for multitasking; however whatever the user was doing is cancelled upon accessing anything else, except in the latest firmware release that can display pictures and play music simultaneously.

The PSP's default battery life varies widely depending on application from less than 3 hours while accessing a wireless network and having screen brightness on its highest setting to more than 11 hours during MP3 playback with the screen turned off. An extended-life 2200 mAh battery will increase this by approximately 20%. A sleep mode is also available that uses minimal battery power to keep the system's RAM active, allowing for "instant on" functionality. A system in sleep mode (with a fully charged battery) has been shown to lose an average of only 1% battery life per 24-hour period. The PSP-1000 series is equipped with a two-pin docking connector immediately below the AC adapter jack for easy drop in charging using a docking station that was to be sold separately. However no such dock was ever released by Sony, and therefore are absent from the PSP-2000 and later versions.

On October 1, 2009 (November 1 in Japan) Sony released the PSP Go, a redesigned version of the PSP. The PSP Go features a sliding design, allowing the screen to slide up past the main controls. The PSP Go lacks a UMD drive, instead containing 16GB of internal memory on which games are stored.

== Technical specifications ==
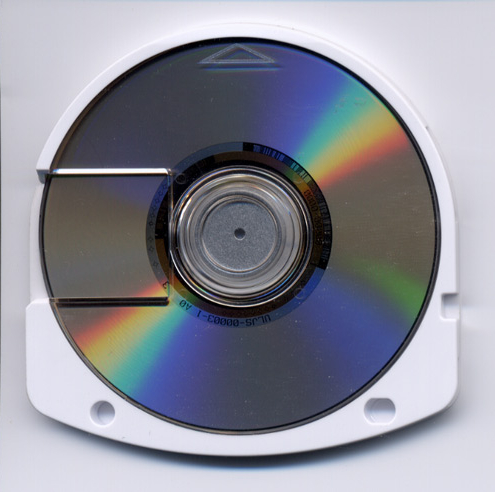
A Universal Media Disc (UMD), the storage medium for PSP games

=== CPU ===
The PSP's main microprocessor is a multifunction device named "Allegrex" that includes a 32-bit MIPS32 R4k-based CPU (Little Endian), a Floating Point Unit, and a Vector Floating Point Unit. Additionally, there is a processor block known as "Media Engine" that contains another 32-bit MIPS32 R4k-base CPU, hardware for multimedia decoding (such as H.264), and a programmable DSP dubbed "Virtual Mobile Engine". The secondary CPU present in the Media Engine is functionally equivalent to the primary CPU save for a lack of a VPU. The MIPS CPU cores are globally clocked between 1 and 333 MHz. During the 2005 GDC, Sony revealed that it had capped the PSP's CPU clock speed at 222 MHz for licensed software. Its reasons for doing so are unknown, but are the subject of some speculation (e.g. to keep power consumption and heating low). Various homebrew tools enable users to operate at 333 MHz, generally leading to a higher frame rate at the expense of battery life. On June 22, 2007, Sony Computer Entertainment confirmed that the firmware version 3.50 does in fact remove this restriction and allows future games to run at the full 333 MHz speed. It does not affect already-released games.

=== Memory ===
The system has 32 MiB main RAM in the original PSP and 64 MiB in the PSP 2000 (and subsequent series) and 4 MiB embedded DRAM in all models. The 4 MiB of eDRAM consists of 2 MiB dedicated to the graphics processing unit and 2 MB dedicated to the Media Engine secondary processor. There is no memory management unit (MMU) for either CPU. No evidence of a TLB has been found. The co-processor that normally manages the TLB-based MMU seems to be a custom effort by Sony and has no integrated memory. Both CPUs contain 16 KiB of two-way set associative instruction cache and data cache respectively. There is additionally 16 KiB of scratchpad RAM which, while faster than main RAM, is not nearly as fast as the integrated cache.

==== 3D vertically stacked eDRAM ====
The PSP's eDRAM memory chip is the earliest known use of a three-dimensional integrated circuit (3D IC) chip in a commercial product. The eDRAM (embedded DRAM) memory was manufactured by Toshiba in a 3D system-in-package chip with two integrated circuit (IC) dies stacked vertically. Toshiba called it "semi-embedded DRAM" at the time, before later calling it a stacked "chip-on-chip" (CoC) solution.

=== GPU ===
The 166 MHz graphics chip has 2 MiB embedded memory and through its 512 bit interface provides hardware polygon rendering, 16bit Depth Buffer, Bézier Surfaces, Bézier Curves, B-Splines, hardware directional per-vertex lighting, Bloom, Motion Blur, Gouraud Shading, Cel Shading, culling, mipmapping, LOD, clipping, Lightmapping, environment mapping, Render to Texture, shadow mapping, shadow volumes, environment projection and perspective-correct texture mapping, texture compression, tessellation, Hardware Transform and Lighting (T&L), fogging, alpha blending, alpha, depth and stencil tests, transparency effects, post-processing effects, vertex blending for morphing effects, and dithering, all in 16 or 24 bit color. The graphics chip also handles image output. Specifications state that the PSP is capable of rendering 33 million flat-shaded polygons per second, with a 664 million pixel per second fill rate.

=== Multimedia playback ===
The PSP is also able to play back movies on a UMD (Universal Media Disc) format. PSP's audio player supports a number of audio codecs, including ATRAC, AAC, MP3, and WMA, and has the option to be played with or without a set of six visualizations. The image viewer will display several common image formats including JPEG, Bitmap, and PNG. However, image viewing is limited by the file size and resolution of the image and any image exceeding a file size or resolution cannot be displayed. This is usually the case with attempting to show DSLR images on a PSP.

MPEG-4 and AVC video formats are also compatible with PSP. With reasonable video and audio bit-rate settings (a resolution of 320×240, a video bit rate of 500 Kbit per second, and an audio sampling rate of 22050 Hz) a 22-minute video file is roughly 55 MB, enough to fit on a Memory Stick Duo as small as a 64 MB. At the same rate, a hundred-minute feature film can fit on a 256 MB Memory Stick. As of firmware update version 3.30, H.264/MPEG-4 AVC Main Profile video files of the following sizes can be played: 720x576, 720×480, 352×480, and 480×272. Many video files, both free-to-distribute and copyrighted, have been encoded for the PSP and are available on the Internet. Game and movie trailers are increasingly available, even from studios' official websites.

There are numerous software applications and hardware devices specifically designed for PSP's various media-centric applications.

=== Wireless networking ===
The WLAN processor is an ARM9 from Marvell Semiconductor.

The PSP can connect to a wireless network through Wi-Fi IEEE 802.11b. This allows 2–16 players with PSPs to create a local, ad hoc network for multiplayer gameplay; or to connect to the Internet via an Internet-connected Wi-Fi router. One can also use an ad hoc network to send images from one PSP to another by use of the "send" and "receive" functions that appear in the "PHOTO" menu. By connecting to the Internet, players can compete against other players also connected to the Internet, or browse the web and download files to the Memory Stick via the built-in web browser. Use of wireless network features increases the power consumption and results in a lower battery life.

The non-slim PSP featured a standard IrDA port located on the top left of the device. To date, the only games or applications to use this feature have been homebrew. This can be used to control many TVs as well as other infrared devices. The port is absent from the new PSP Slim redesign, probably due to the lack of any official software that utilised it. Instead, the Wi-Fi switch has moved to the top where the port previously was, so gamers do not accidentally turn Wi-Fi off when browsing the web, playing online, etc.

The PSP Go is the only revision equipped with Bluetooth technology.

=== Internet connectivity ===
The PSP's main menu allows the user to configure the system for use across the Internet or an intranet via a wireless connection, known as infrastructure mode. The PSP can recognize protected and non-protected wireless networks within its range, and supports connecting to WEP and WPA encrypted networks (WPA2 is not supported). South Korean PSPs have shipped with software providing web browsing and multimedia streaming features, but only through company-owned Wi-Fi hot spots, and with a monthly fee.

Use of infrastructure networks in PSP software began with a small number of titles at the U.S. launch, supporting online play. The RSS features allow the user to download video web feeds or listen to podcasts from websites. RSS or podcast content can be saved to the Memory Stick Duo. Audio (and more recently video) content can be streamed and played "live". After the release of firmware 3.50, there is now an RSS Guide function.

Sony's LocationFree Player allows users to stream live television broadcasts (or other video content) to their PSP, within their Wi-Fi network, or remotely via the Internet. After the release of firmware 3.80, streaming audio is now available to be used on the PSP currently only supporting ShoutCast and Icecast internet radio.

On January 30, 2008, firmware update 3.90 was released which enabled Skype WiFi phone function on the Slim & Lite model, Brite model, and the PSP Go.

== Gamesharing ==
Some titles for the PSP support a feature dubbed "gamesharing," which facilitates a limited set of multiplayer features between two PSPs with only one copy of the game UMD. A reduced version of the game being shared is transferred to the PSP without a UMD via the PSP's Wi-Fi connection, whereupon it is loaded into RAM and runs. Such "gameshare" versions of titles usually have their feature set reduced because of technical limitations (small RAM size, slow bandwidth of 802.11b connection).

== See also ==
- PlayStation 3 hardware
- Go!Cam
