= Package on a package =

Integrated circuit packaging method

Package on a package, or package on package (PoP), is an integrated circuit packaging method to vertically combine ball grid array (BGA) packages for discrete logic and memory. Two or more packages are installed atop each other, i.e. stacked, with a standard interface to route signals between them. PoP allows higher component density in devices, such as mobile phones, personal digital assistants (PDA), and digital cameras, at the cost of being slightly taller. Stacks with more than 2 packages are uncommon, due to heat dissipation considerations.

== Configuration ==
Two widely used configurations exist for PoP:

- Pure memory stacking: two or more memory only packages are stacked on each other
- Mixed logic-memory stacking: logic (CPU) package on the bottom, memory package on top. For example, the bottom could be a system on a chip (SoC) for a mobile phone. The logic package is on the bottom because it needs many more BGA connections to the motherboard.

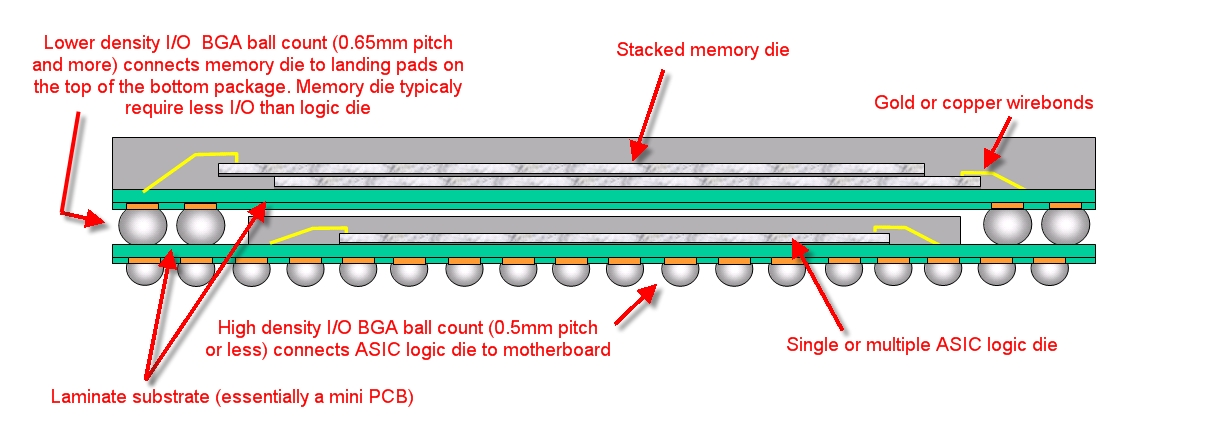
Typical logic plus memory PoP stack, common to mobile phone SoCs or baseband modems from 2005 onward

During PCB assembly, the bottom package of a PoP stack is placed directly on the PCB, and the other package(s) of the stack are stacked on top. The packages of a PoP stack become attached to each other (and to the PCB) during reflow soldering.

PoP packaging can be done by the chip manufacturer (such as Samsung or TSMC), or can be done by the OEM (such as Xiaomi).

== Benefits ==
The package on a package technique tries to combine the benefits of traditional packaging with the benefits of die-stacking techniques, while avoiding their drawbacks.

Traditional packaging places each die in its own package, a package designed for normal PCB assembly techniques that place each package directly on the PCB side-by-side. The 3D die-stacking system in package (SiP) techniques stacks multiple die in a single package, which has several advantages and also some disadvantages compared to traditional PCB assembly.

In embedded PoP techniques, chips are embedded in a substrate on the bottom of the package. This PoP technology enables smaller packages with shorter electrical connections and is supported by companies such as Advanced Semiconductor Engineering (ASE).

=== Advantages over traditional isolated-chip packaging ===
The most obvious benefit is motherboard space savings. PoP uses much less PCB area, almost as little as stacked-die packages.

Electrically, PoP offers benefits by minimizing track length between different interoperating parts, such as a controller and memory. This yields better electrical performance of devices, since shorter routing of interconnections between circuits yields faster signal propagation and reduced noise and cross-talk.

=== Advantages over chip stacking ===
There are several key differences between stacked-die and stacked-package products.

The main financial benefit of package on a package is that the memory device is decoupled from the logic device. Therefore this gives PoP all the same advantages that traditional packaging has over stacked-die products:

- The memory package can be tested separately from the logic package
- Only "known good" packages are used in final assembly (if the memory is bad only the memory is discarded and so on). Compare this to stacked-die packages where the entire set is useless and rejected if either the memory or logic is bad.
- The end user (such as makers of mobile phones or digital cameras) controls the logistics. This means memory from different suppliers can be used at different times without changing the logic. The memory becomes a commodity to be sourced from the lowest cost supplier. This trait is also a benefit compared to PiP (package in package) which requires a specific memory device to be designed in and sourced upstream of the end user.
- Any mechanically mating top package can be used. For a low-end phone, a smaller memory configuration may be used on the top package. For a high-end phone, more memory could be used with the same bottom package. This simplifies inventory control by the OEM. For a stacked-die package or even PiP (package in package), the exact memory configuration must be known weeks or months in advance.
- Because the memory only comes into the mix at final assembly, there is no reason for logic suppliers to source any memory. With a stacked-die device, the logic provider must buy wafers of memory from a memory supplier.

== JEDEC standardization ==
- JEDEC JC-11 committee deals with package outline drawing standards related to the bottom PoP package. See documents MO-266A and JEDEC publication 95, Design Guide 4.22.
- JEDEC JC-63 committee deals with top (memory) PoP package pinout standardization. See JEDEC Standard No. 21-C, Page 3.12.2 – 1

== Other names ==
Package on a package is also known by other names:

- PoP: refers to the combined top and bottom packages
- PoPt: refers to the top package
- PoPb: refers to the bottom package
- PSvfBGA: refers to the bottom package: Package Stackable Very thin Fine pitch Ball Grid Array
- PSfcCSP: refers to the bottom package: Package Stackable Flip Chip Chip Scale Package

== History ==
In 2001, a Toshiba research team including T. Imoto, M. Matsui and C. Takubo developed a "System Block Module" wafer bonding process for manufacturing 3D integrated circuit (3D IC) packages. The earliest known commercial use of a 3D package-on-package chip was in Sony's PlayStation Portable (PSP) handheld game console, released in 2004. The PSP hardware includes eDRAM (embedded DRAM) memory manufactured by Toshiba in a 3D package chip with two dies stacked vertically. Toshiba called it "semi-embedded DRAM" at the time, before later calling it a stacked "chip-on-chip" (CoC) solution.

In April 2007, Toshiba commercialized an eight-layer 3D chip package, the 16 GB THGAM embedded NAND flash memory chip, which was manufactured with eight stacked 2 GB NAND flash chips. The same month, U.S. patent 7,923,830 ("Package-on-package secure module having anti-tamper mesh in the substrate of the upper package") was filed by Steven M. Pope and Ruben C. Zeta of Maxim Integrated. In September 2007, Hynix Semiconductor introduced 24-layer 3D packaging technology, with a 16 GB flash memory chip that was manufactured with 24 stacked NAND flash chips using a wafer bonding process.
