= Interposer =

Layer between an integrated circuit and a printed circuit board

BGA with an interposer between the integrated circuit die to ball grid array

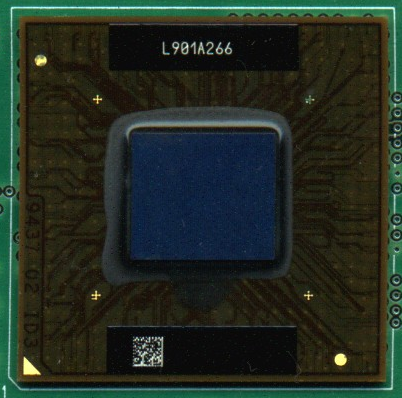
Pentium II: example of an interposer in dark yellow, integrated circuit die to ball grid array chip carrier

An interposer is an electrical interface routing between one socket or connection and another. The purpose of an interposer is to spread a connection to a wider pitch or to reroute a connection to a different connection.

An interposer can be made of either silicon or organic (printed circuit board-like) material.

Interposer comes from the Latin word interpōnere, meaning "to put between". They are often used in BGA packages, multi-chip modules and high-bandwidth memory.

A common example of an interposer is an integrated circuit die to BGA, such as in the Pentium II. This is done through various substrates, both rigid and flexible, most commonly FR4 for rigid, and polyimide for flexible. Silicon and glass are also evaluated as an integration method. Interposer stacks are also a widely accepted, cost-effective alternative to 3D ICs. There are already several products with interposer technology in the market, notably the AMD Fiji/Fury GPU, and the Xilinx Virtex-7 FPGA. In 2016, CEA Leti demonstrated their second-generation 3D-NoC technology, which combines small dies ("chiplets"), fabricated at the FDSOI 28 nm node, on a 65 nm CMOS interposer.

Another example of an interposer is the adapter used to plug a SATA drive into a SAS backplane with redundant ports. While SAS drives have two ports that can be used to connect to redundant paths or storage controllers, SATA drives only have a single port. Directly, they can only connect to a single controller or path. SATA drives can be connected to nearly all SAS backplanes without adapters, but using an interposer with a port-switching logic allows providing paths redundancy.

== See also ==
- Die preparation
- Integrated circuit
- Semiconductor fabrication
