= AVO =

Avo or AVO may refer to:

== Companies and organizations ==
- ÁVO, Hungarian secret police (1950–1956)
- Avo Photonics, optical electronics firm
- AVO Cigars, tobacco company founded by Avo Uvezian

== People ==
- Avo (name), masculine given name found in Estonia

== Science ==
- Alaska Volcano Observatory, a hazard monitoring program
- Amplitude versus offset, a concept used in reflection seismology
- Astrophysical Virtual Observatory, a European research project
- Avometer, a brand of multimeter that measures amps–volts–ohms

== Other ==
- Agent–verb–object, a sentence structure in linguistics
- Apprehended Violence Order, an injunction in Australia
- Avon Park Executive Airport (IATA code), in Florida, U.S.
- 1/100 of a Macanese pataca
- 1/100 of a Portuguese Timorese pataca
- "AVO", a song on Amor Vincit Omnia by Pure Reason Revolution
- Avo, a character from Fable
- Avo, nom-de-guerre of Armenian-American revolutionary Monte Melkonian (1957–1993)

== See also ==
- Avos (disambiguation)
