= Ball bonding =

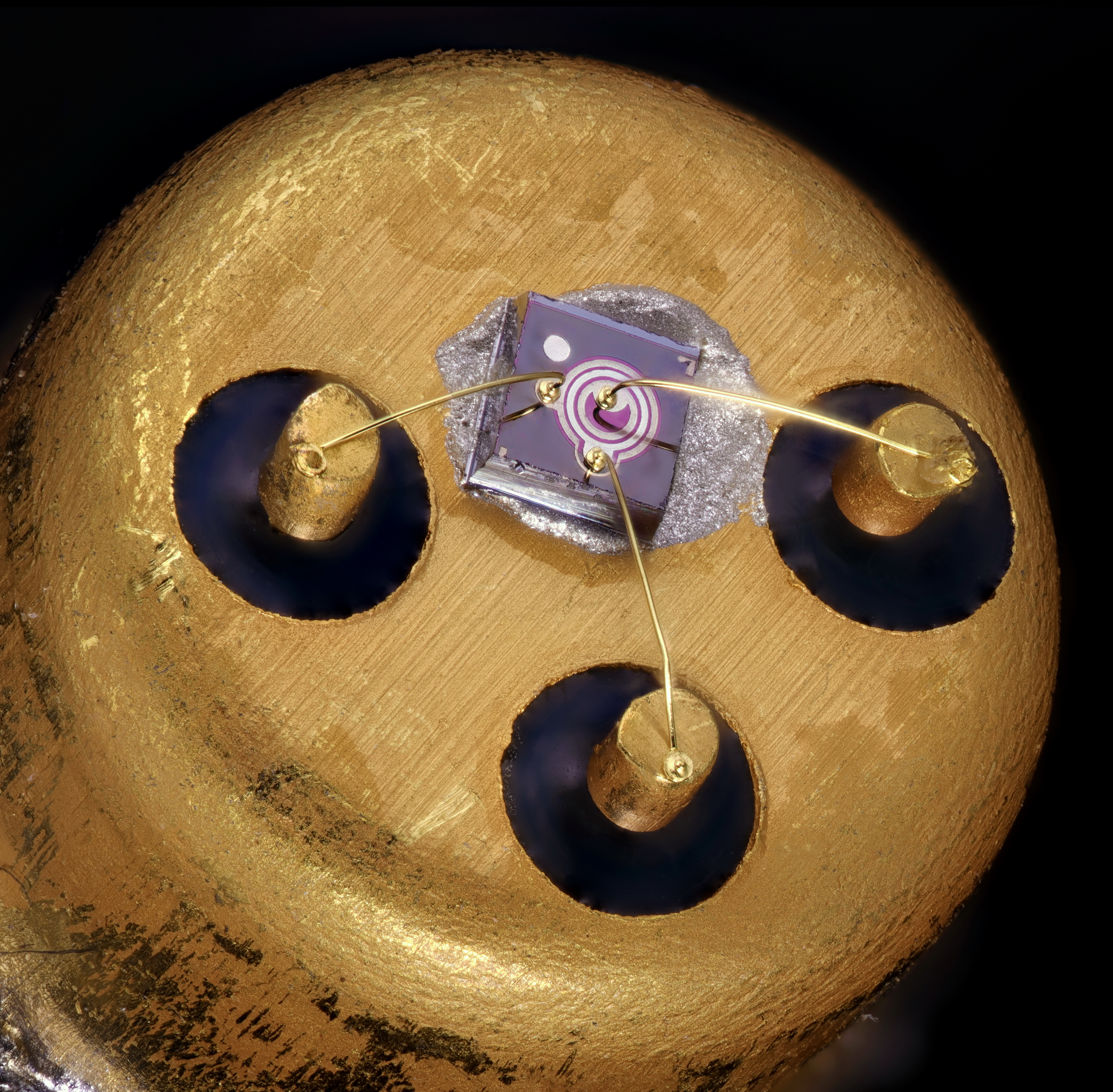
Gold wire ball-bonded on a transistor die

Ball bonding is a type of wire bonding, and is the most common way to make the electrical interconnections between a bare silicon die and the lead frame of the package it is placed in during semiconductor device fabrication.

Gold or copper wire can be used, though gold is more common because its oxide is not as problematic in making a weld. If copper wire is used, nitrogen must be used as a cover gas to prevent the copper oxides from forming during the wire bonding process. Copper is also harder than gold, which makes damage to the surface of the chip more likely. However copper is cheaper than gold and has superior electrical properties, and so remains a compelling choice.

Almost all modern ball bonding processes use a combination of heat, pressure, and ultrasonic energy to make a weld at each end of the wire. The wire used can be as small as 15 μm in diameter—such that several welds could fit across the width of a human hair.

A person upon first seeing a ball bonder will usually compare its operation to that of a sewing machine. In fact there is a needle-like disposable tool called the capillary, through which the wire is fed. A high-voltage electric charge is applied to the wire. This melts the wire at the tip of the capillary. The tip of the wire forms into a ball because of the surface tension of the molten metal.

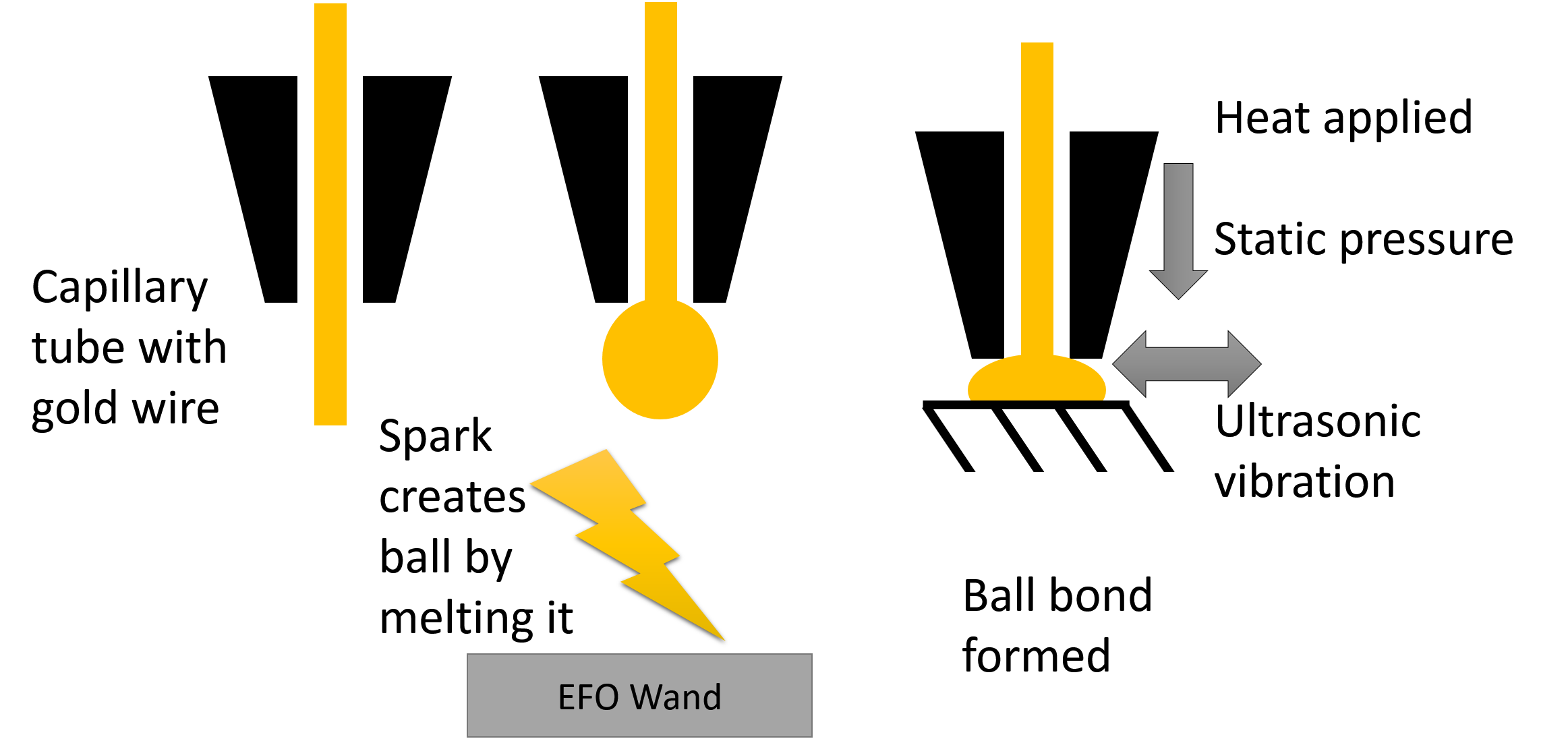
Ball bonding processes including (1) ball formation and (2) ball bond formation

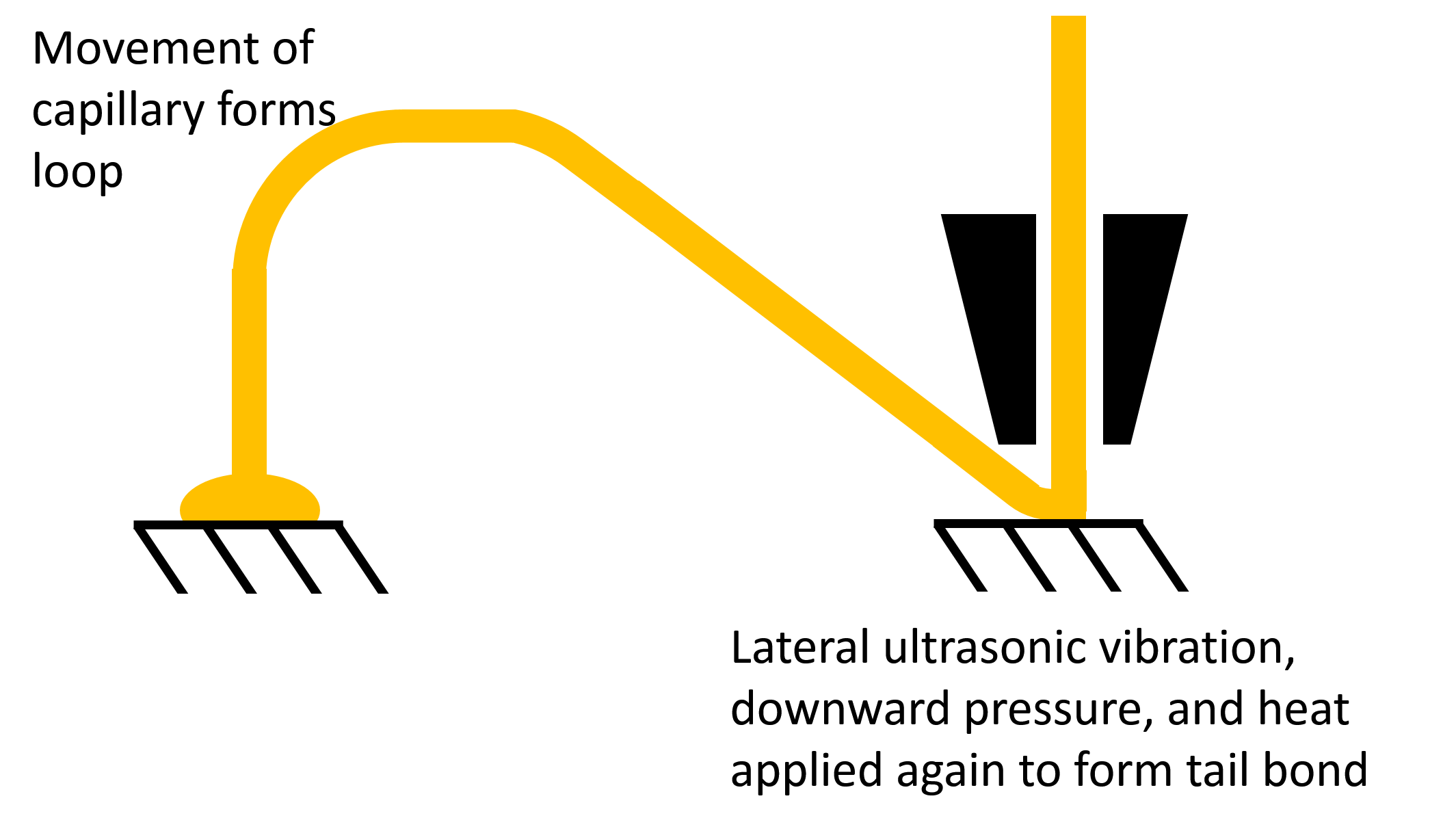
Ball bonding processes including (3) loop formation and (4) tail bond formation

The ball quickly solidifies, and the capillary is lowered to the surface of the chip, which is typically heated to at least 125 °C. The machine then pushes down on the capillary and applies ultrasonic energy with an attached transducer. The combined heat, pressure, and ultrasonic energy create a weld between the copper or gold ball and the surface of the chip—which is usually copper or aluminum. This is the so-called ball bond that gives the process its name. (All-aluminum systems in semiconductor fabrication eliminate the "purple plague"—a brittle gold-aluminum intermetallic compound—sometimes associated with pure gold bonding wire. This property makes aluminum ideal for ultrasonic bonding.)

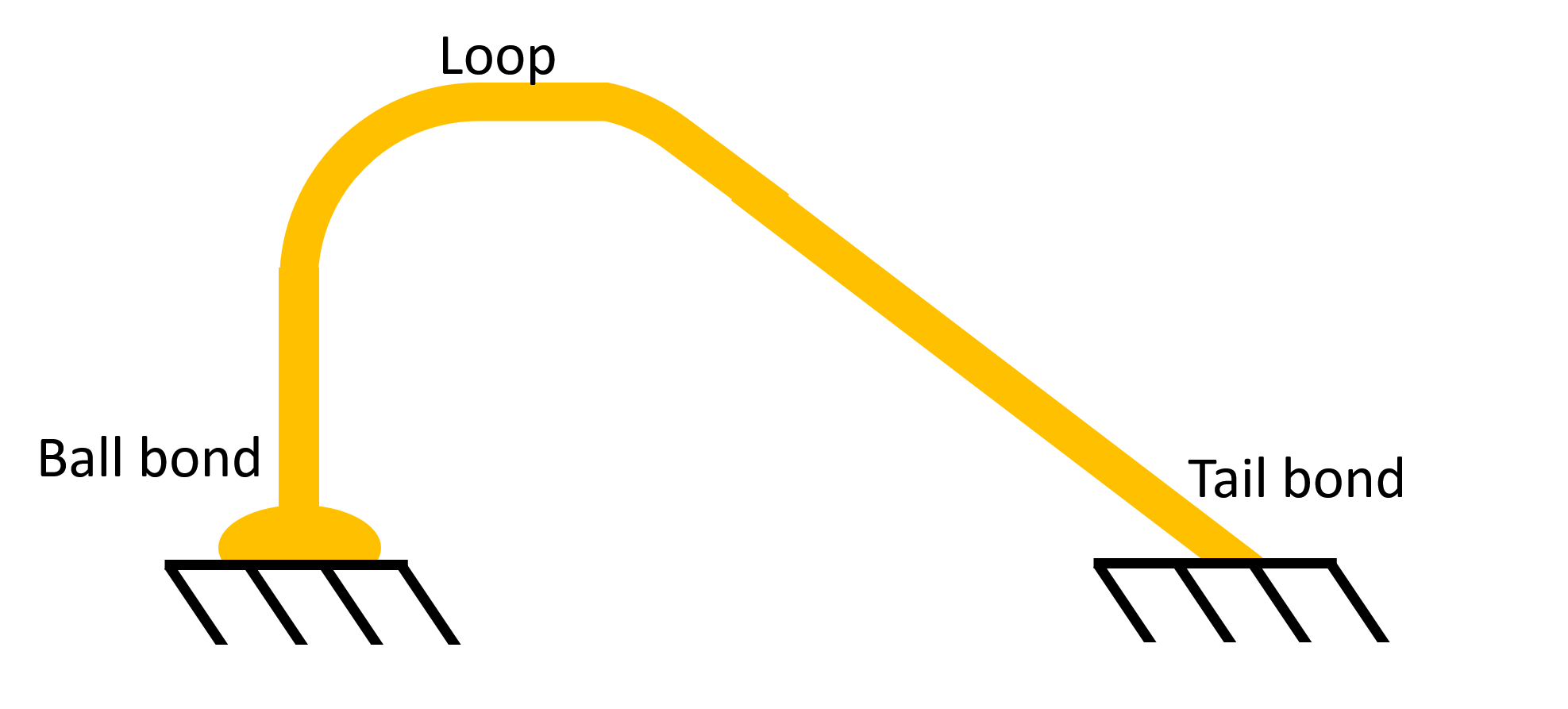
Diagram of a finished ball bond wire connection

Next the wire is passed out through the capillary and the machine moves over a few millimeters to the location that the chip needs to be wired up to (usually called the leadframe). The machine again descends to the surface, this time without making a ball so that the wire is crushed between the leadframe and the tip of the capillary. This time the surface is usually gold, palladium, or silver—but the weld is made in the same way. The resulting weld is quite different in appearance from the ball bond, and is referred to as the wedge bond, tail bond, or simply as the second bond.

In the final step the machine pays out a small length of wire and tears the wire from the surface using a set of clamps. This leaves a small tail of wire hanging from the end of the capillary. The cycle then starts again with the high-voltage electric charge being applied to this tail.

The process where wire is cut right after ball is formed is also called stud bumping. Stud bumping is used when stacking chips in system in package (SIP) modules.

The current state-of-the-art machines (as of 2003) can repeat this cycle about 20 times per second. A modern ball bonder is fully automatic and is essentially a self-sufficient industrial robot, complete with a vision system, sensors, and complex servo systems.

== Ball bonding transducer ==
Piezoelectric transducers are used to provide ultrasonic energy in the ball bonding process. These transducers are known as bolt-clamped transducers or Langevin transducers. They consist of metal components and piezoelectric elements, all held together by a bolt. These transducers operate at their resonant frequency of lateral vibration to introduce lateral ultrasonic excitation to the capillary. Along the lateral direction of the transducer, there exists nodal points (large displacement) and antinodal points (no displacement). Piezoelectric elements expand and contract upon alternating voltage excitation (which will be at the resonance frequency), thereby exciting resonance vibration in the structure. Usually, a few elements are stacked in order to increase the electric field for an applied voltage (stress is generated proportional to electric field). In order to maximize the energy transfer from the piezoelectric element to the structure, they are placed at nodes, which are high strain and high stress regions. At the same time, in order to minimize energy loss to the surroundings, the transducer is held at an antinode (no displacement).

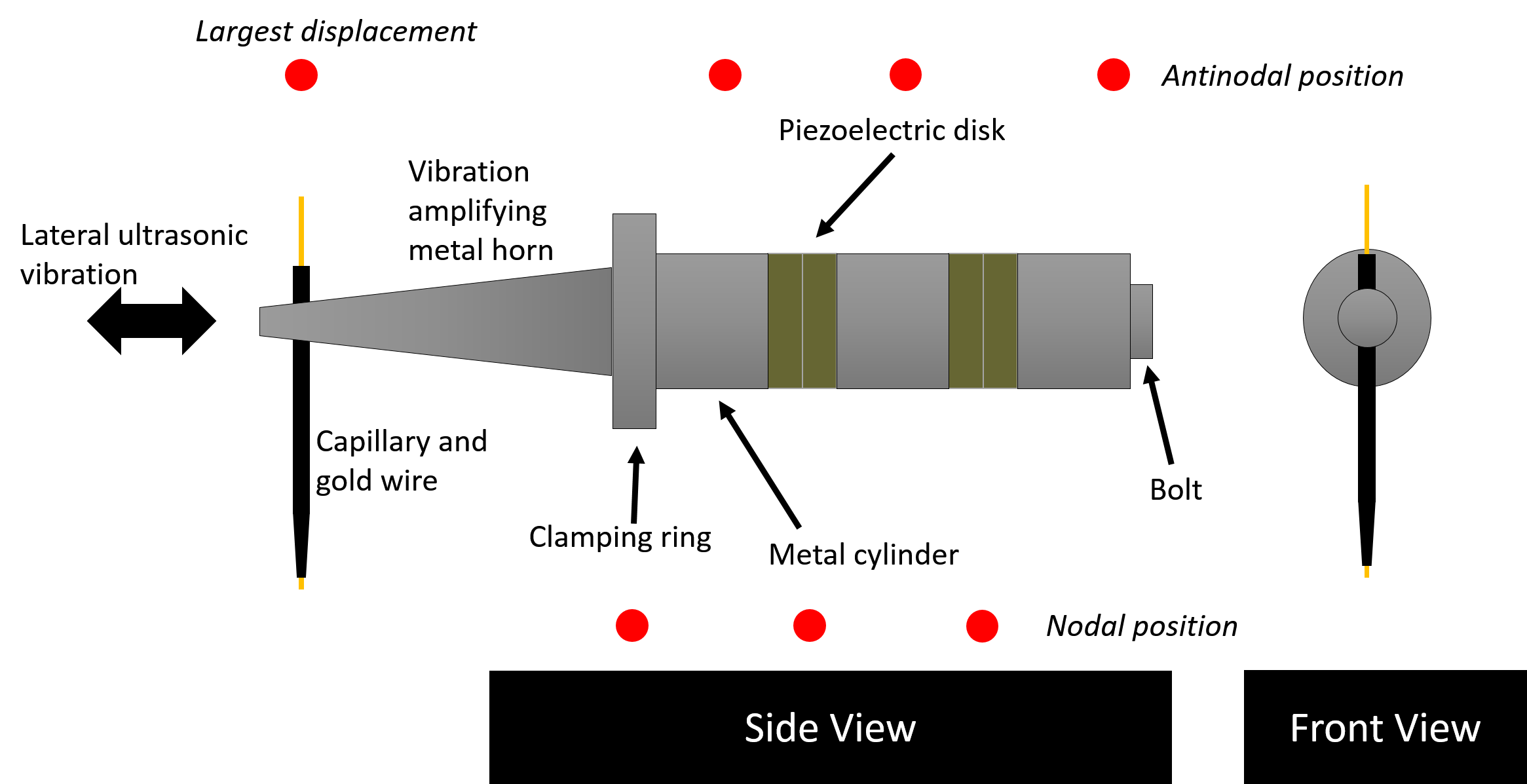
Typical ball bonding transducer. This transducer operates at its third resonance frequency (4 antinodes and 3 nodes)

At the front end of the transducer a tapered horn is used to magnify the vibration. Different tapering profiles can be used to get the desired result, such as a linear taper or parabolic taper. The horn's taper reduces the cross-sectional area, causing a larger ultrasonic energy density, then leading to more displacement near the tip. The capillary is placed near the tip for this reason. Higher order bending modes are excited in the capillary, which are quite unideal. In order to mitigate this effect, the capillary clamping position is adjusted to an antinode of the capillary. Ideally, the capillary would be short, but this is not possible because the bond needs to be made in hard to reach areas.

The bolt clamps the whole structure together by screwing into the horn (depending on the configuration). Correct preload needs to be administered in order to optimize performance. Piezo ceramics are weak under tension; therefore, a large preload will ensure the ceramics will operate mostly in compression due to the bias stress.

== See also ==
- Die (integrated circuit)
- Wedge bonding
- Wire bonding
