= Die (integrated circuit) =

Unpackaged integrated circuit

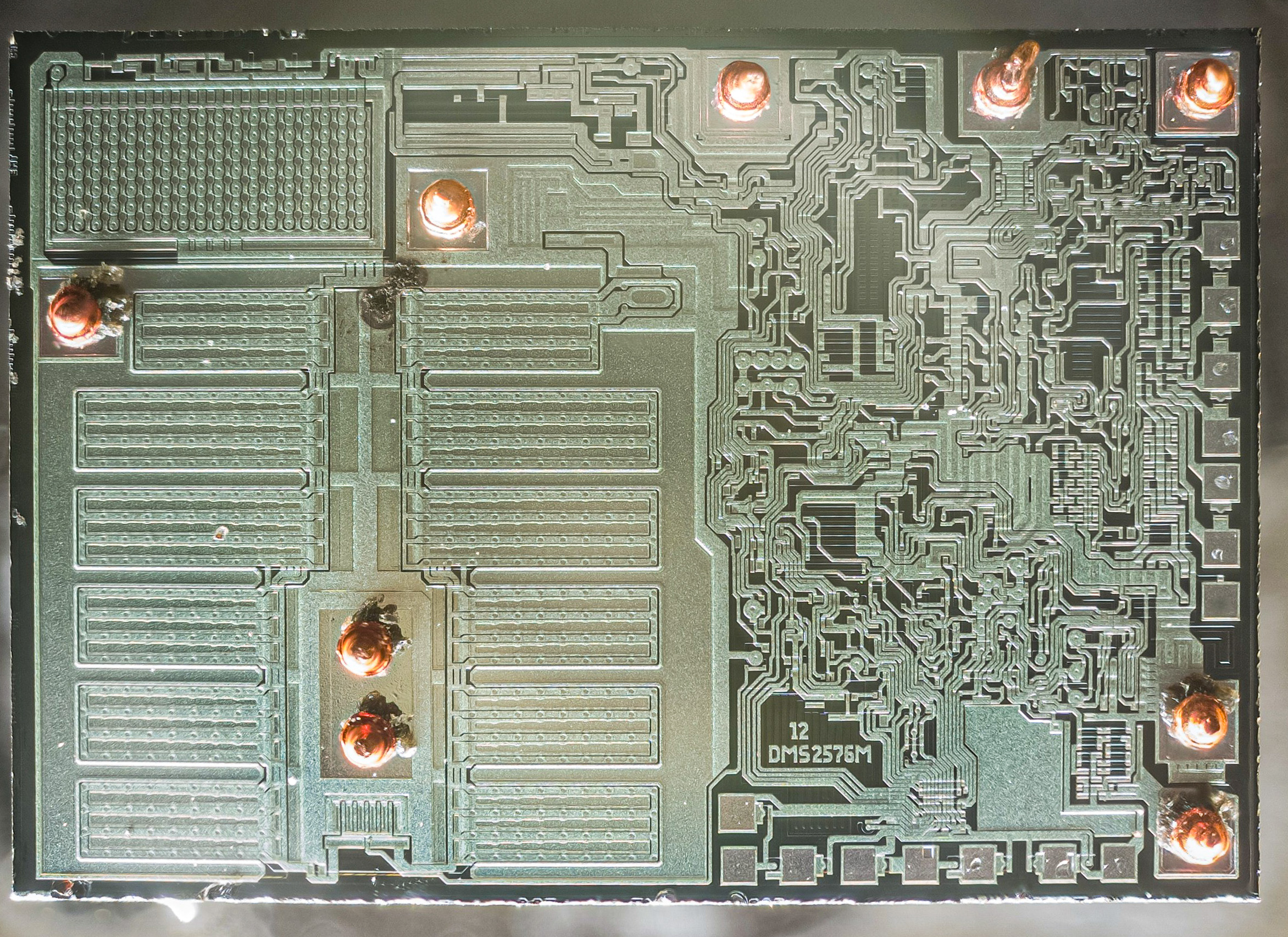
LM2576T monolithic integrated circuit die

In the context of integrated circuits, a die (or silicon die) is a block of semiconducting material on which a given functional circuit is fabricated. Typically, integrated circuits are produced in large batches on a single wafer of electronic-grade silicon (EGS) or other semiconductor (such as GaAs) through processes such as photolithography. The wafer is cut (diced) into many pieces, each containing one copy of the circuit. Each of these pieces is called a die.

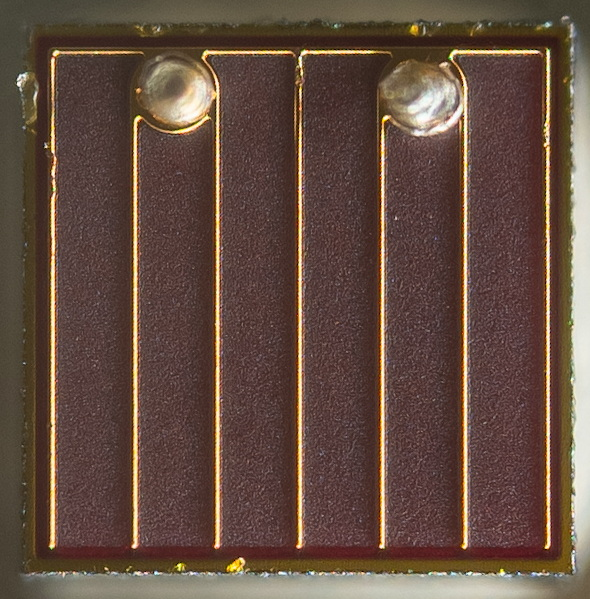
1-watt red power LED die

There are three commonly used plural forms: dice, dies, and die. To simplify handling and integration onto a printed circuit board, most dies are packaged in various forms.

== Manufacturing process ==
Most dies are composed of silicon and used for integrated circuits. The process begins with the production of monocrystalline silicon ingot. These ingots are then sliced into disks with a diameter of up to 300 mm.

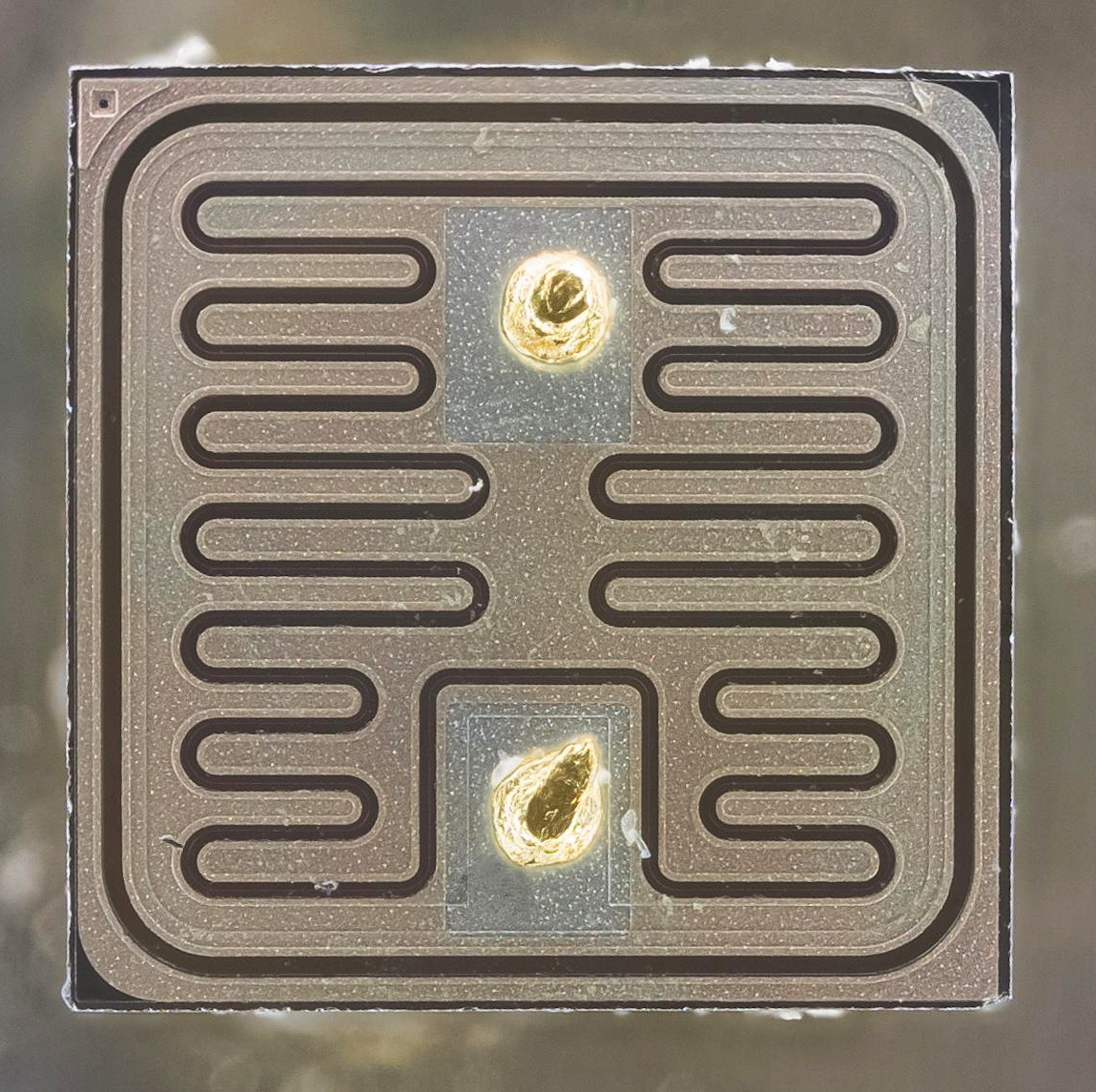
Typical NPN transistor. Size of die is roughly 1 mm × 1 mm.

These wafers are then polished to a mirror finish before going through photolithography. In many steps the transistors are manufactured and connected with metal interconnect layers. These prepared wafers then go through wafer testing to test their functionality. The wafers are then sliced and sorted to filter out the faulty dies. Functional dies are then packaged and the completed integrated circuit is ready to be shipped.

== Uses ==
A die can host various types of circuits. One common use case of an integrated circuit die is in the form of a central processing unit (CPU). Through advances in modern technology, the size of the transistor within the die has shrunk exponentially, following Moore's law. Other uses for dies can range from LED lighting to power semiconductor devices.

== Images ==
Images of dies are commonly called die shots.

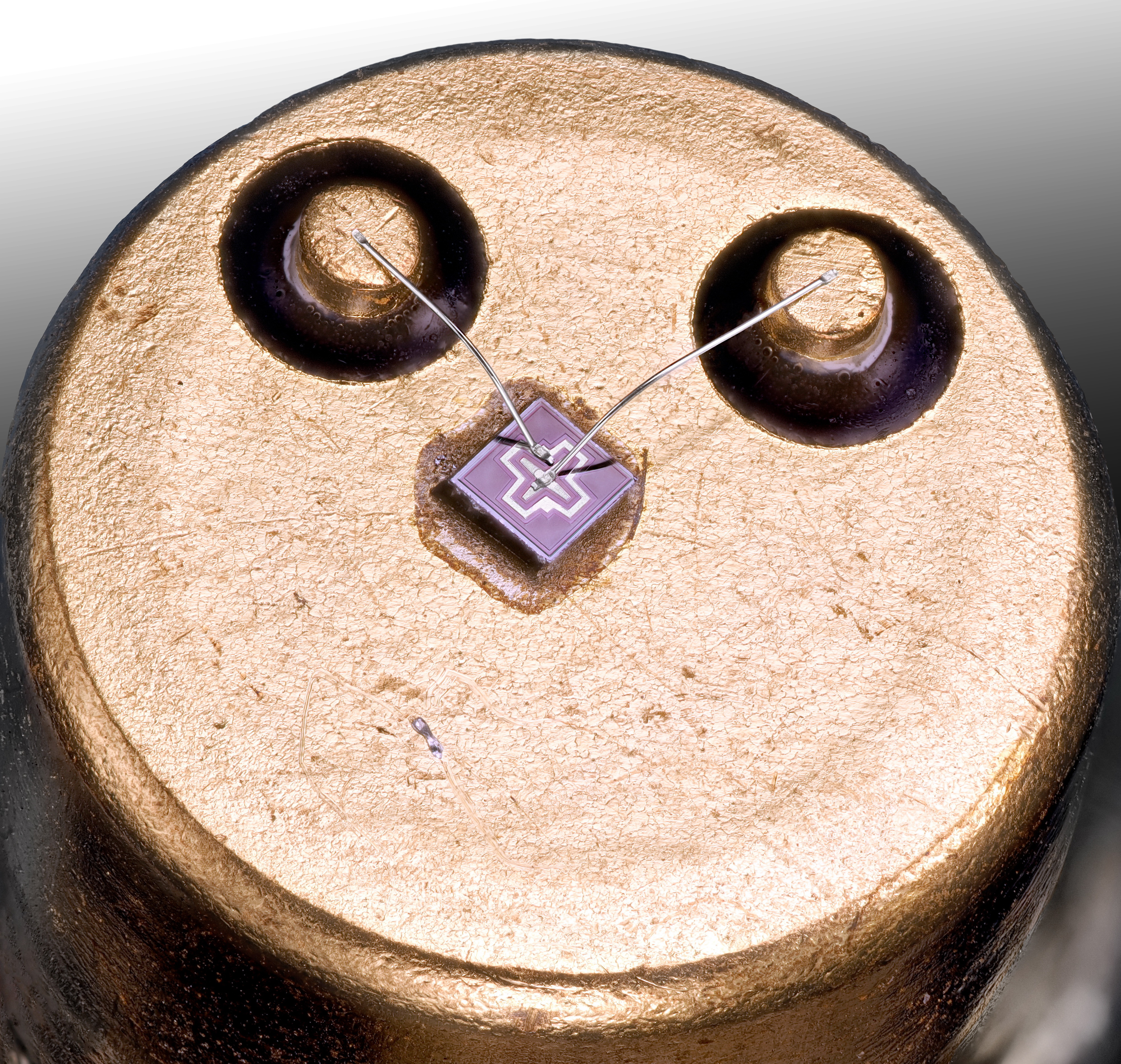
Single NPN bipolar junction transistor die

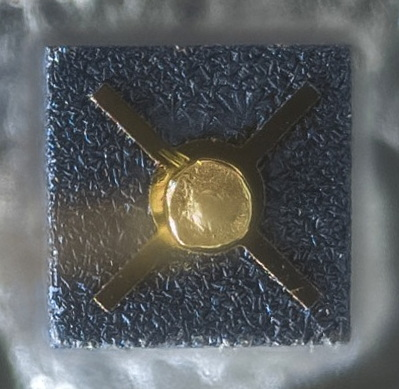
Die of an infrared receiver

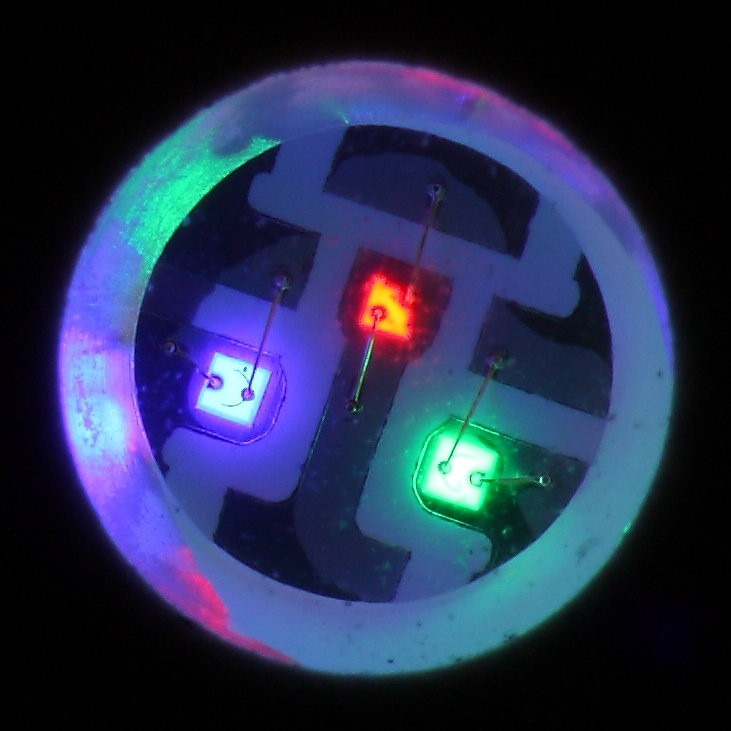
Close-up of an RGB light-emitting diode, showing the three individual dies

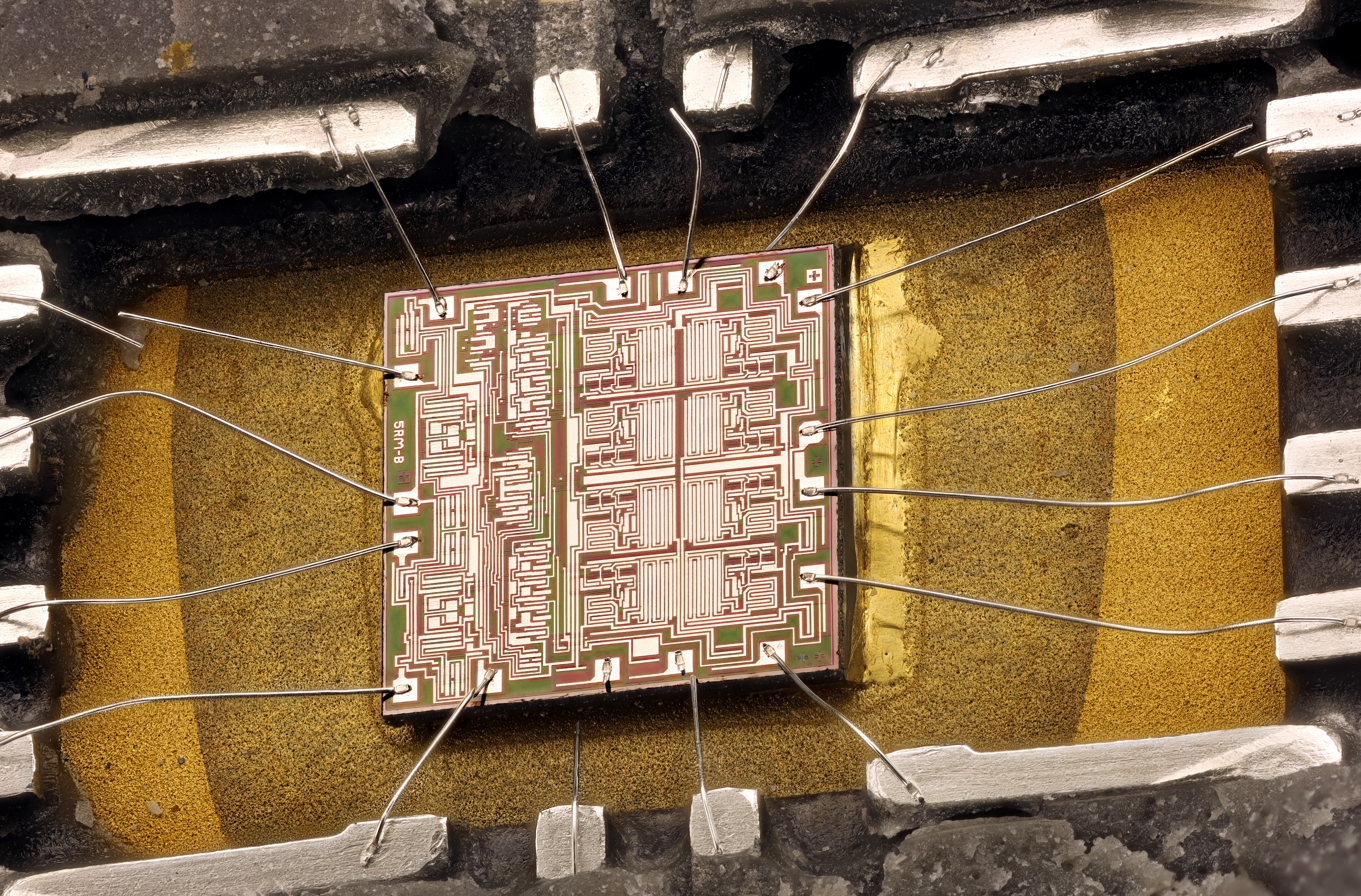
A small-scale integrated-circuit die, with bond wires attached

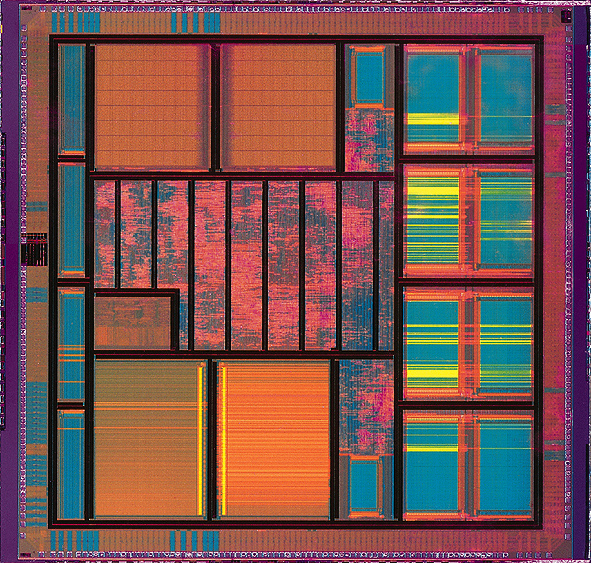
A VLSI integrated-circuit die

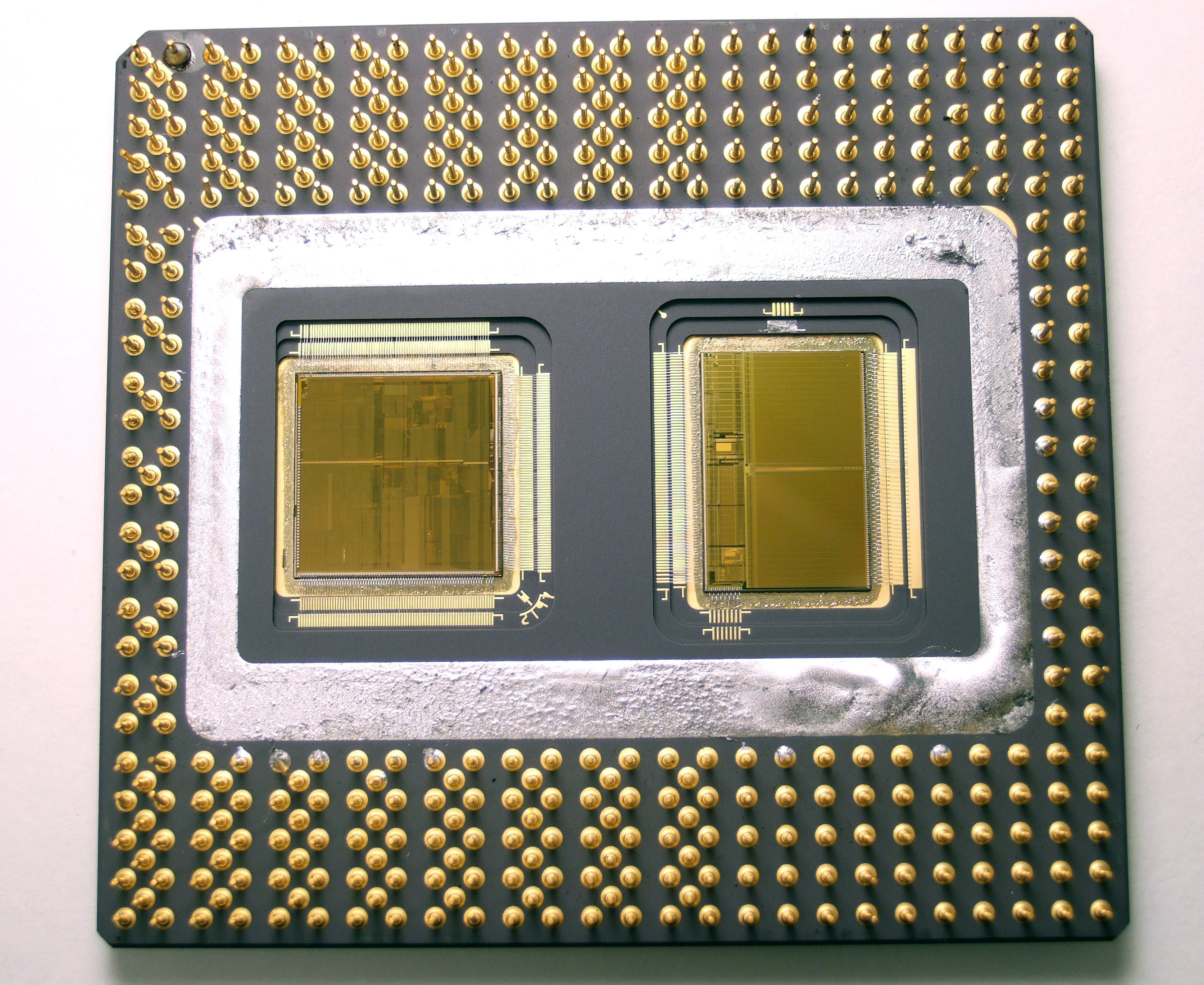
Two dies bonded onto one chip carrier

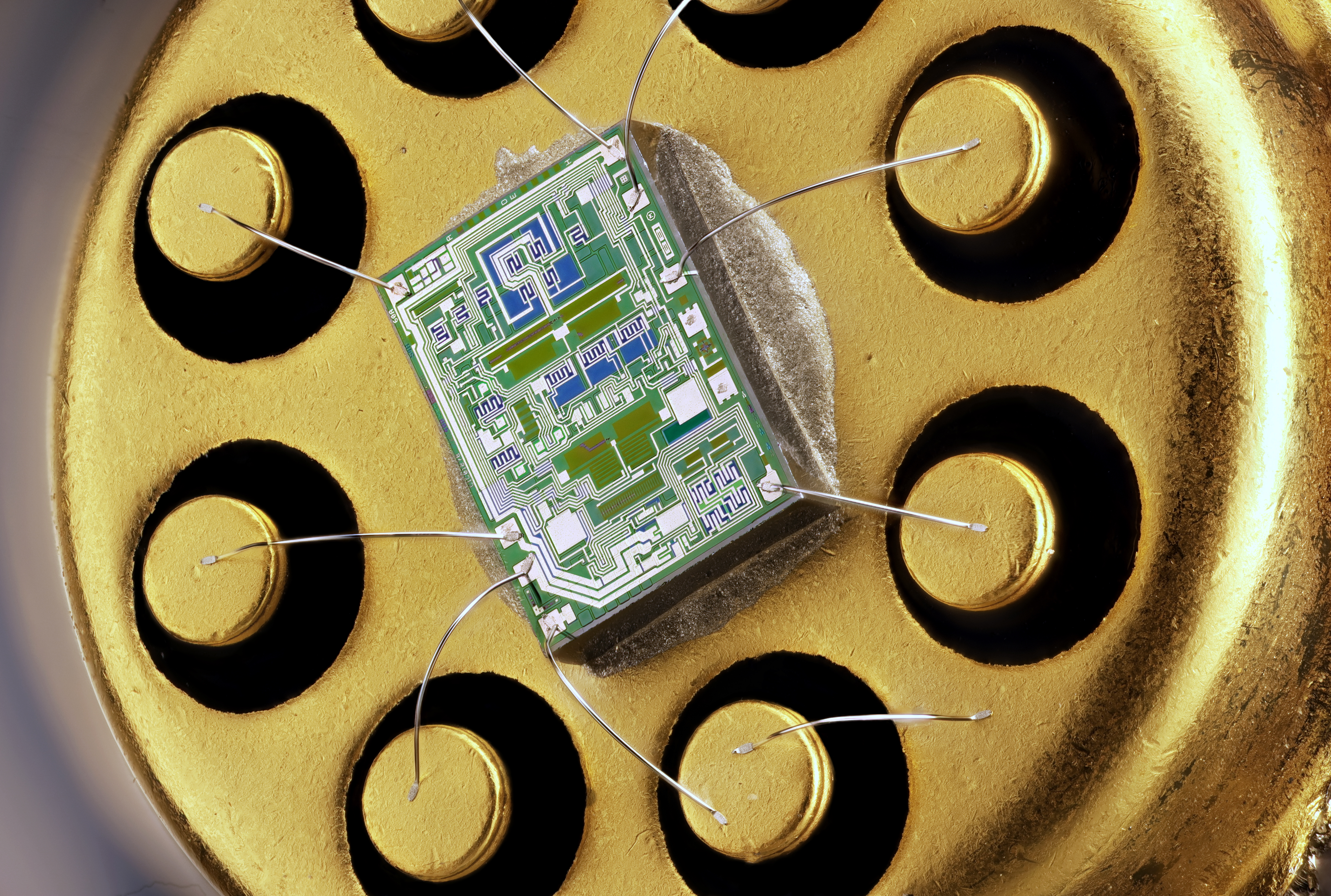
A monolithic IC operational amplifier

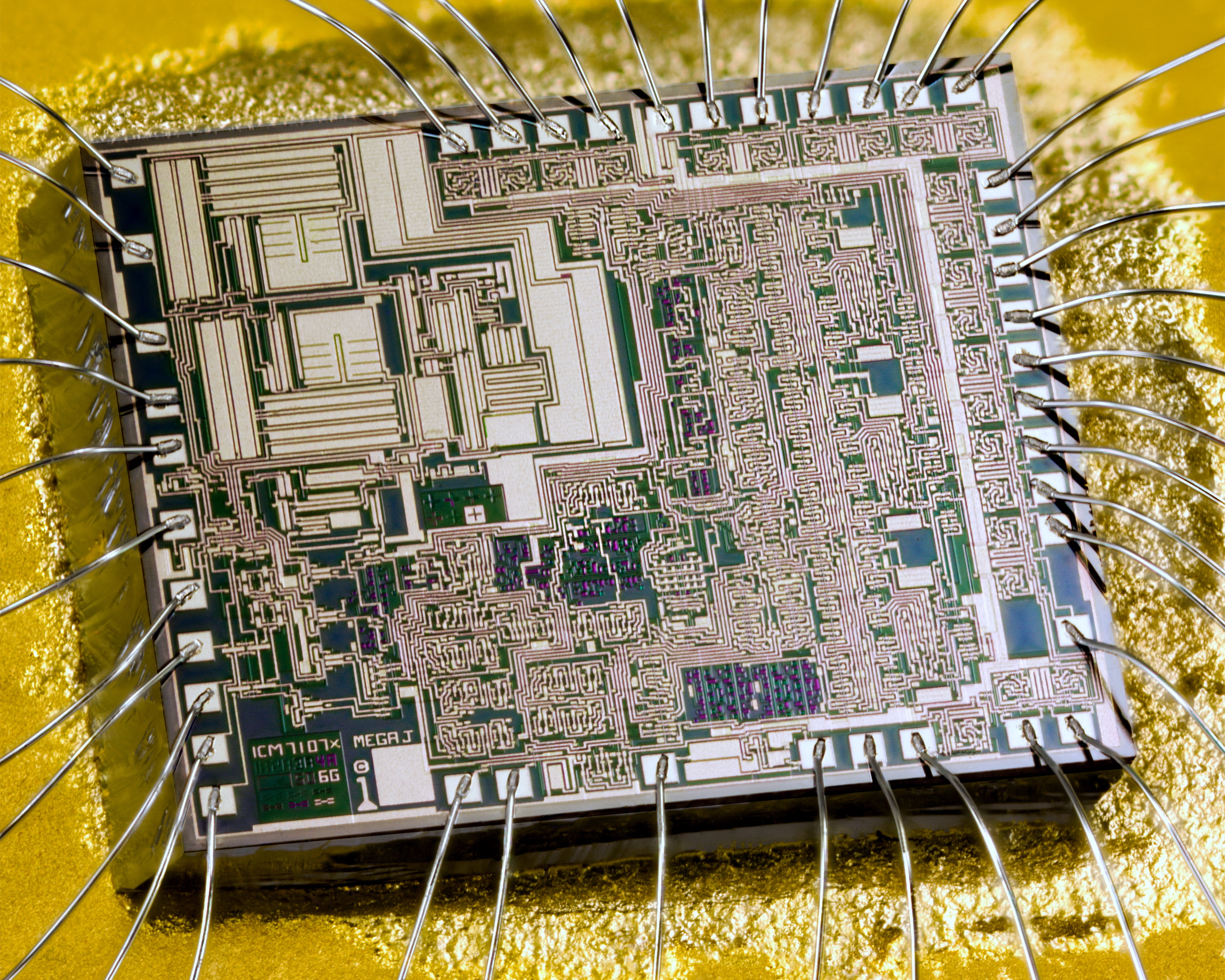
3 1/2 digit single-chip A/D converter

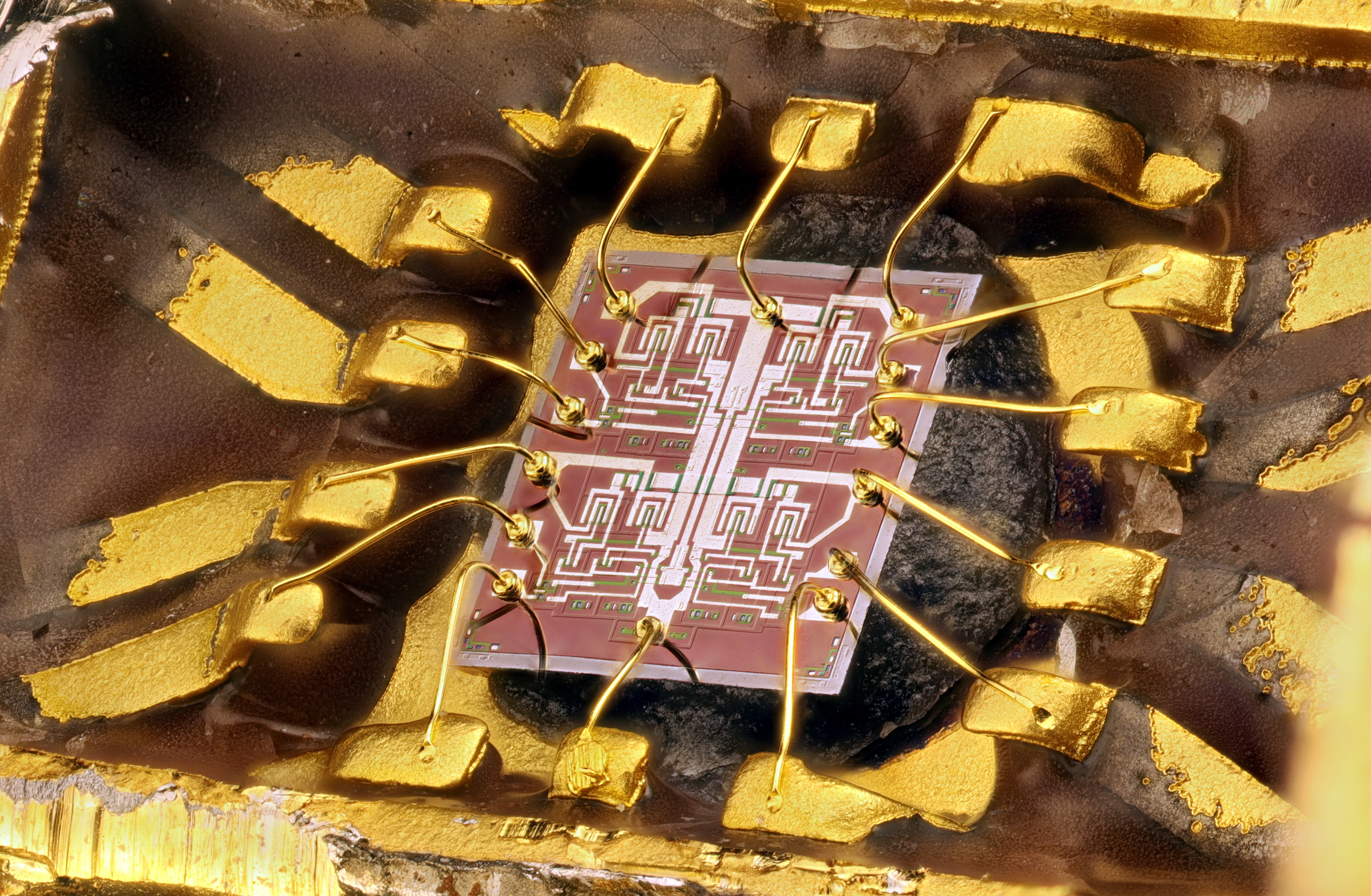
SN7400 Quad NAND gate in flat pack package. 1965.

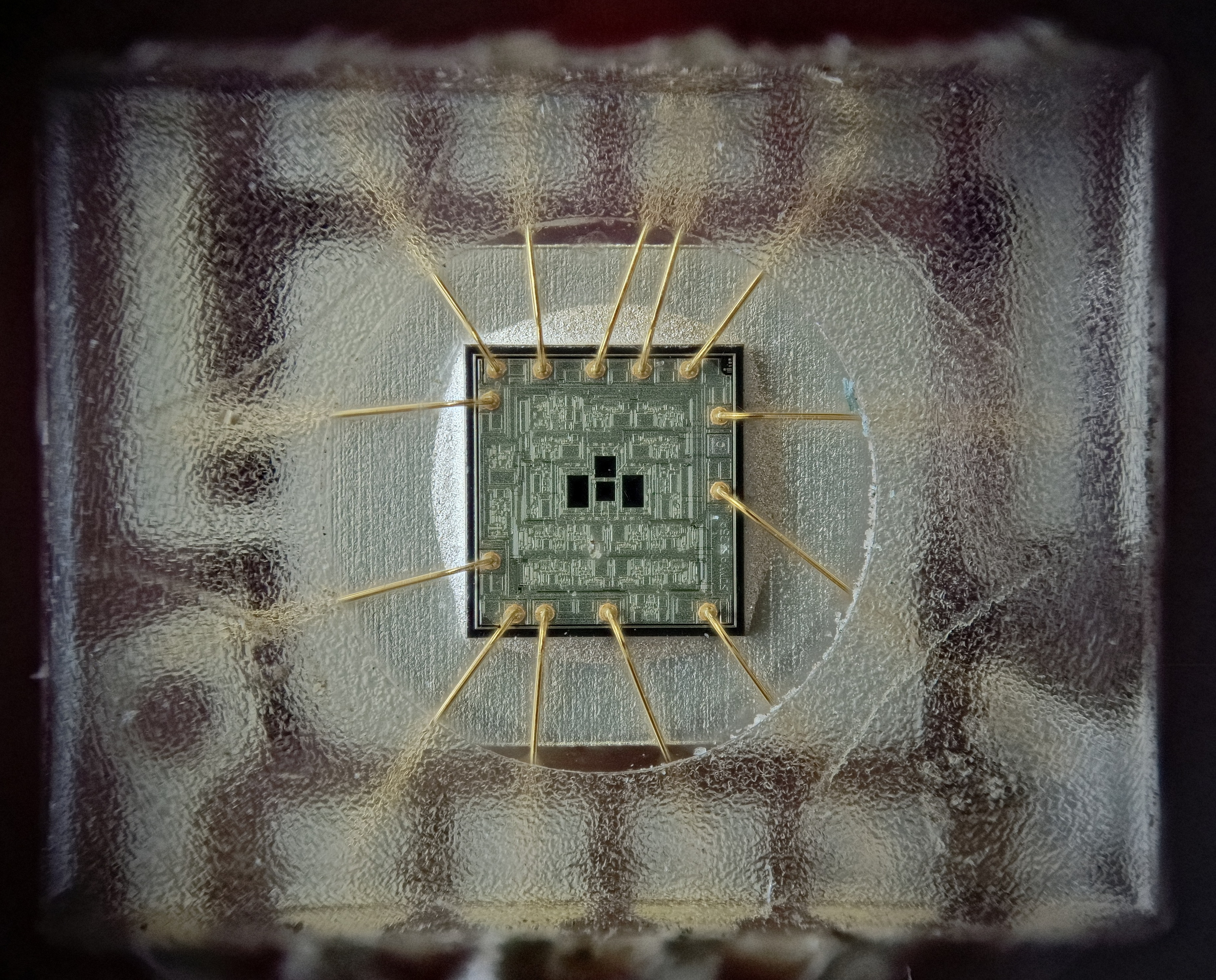
CD-ROM drive head die

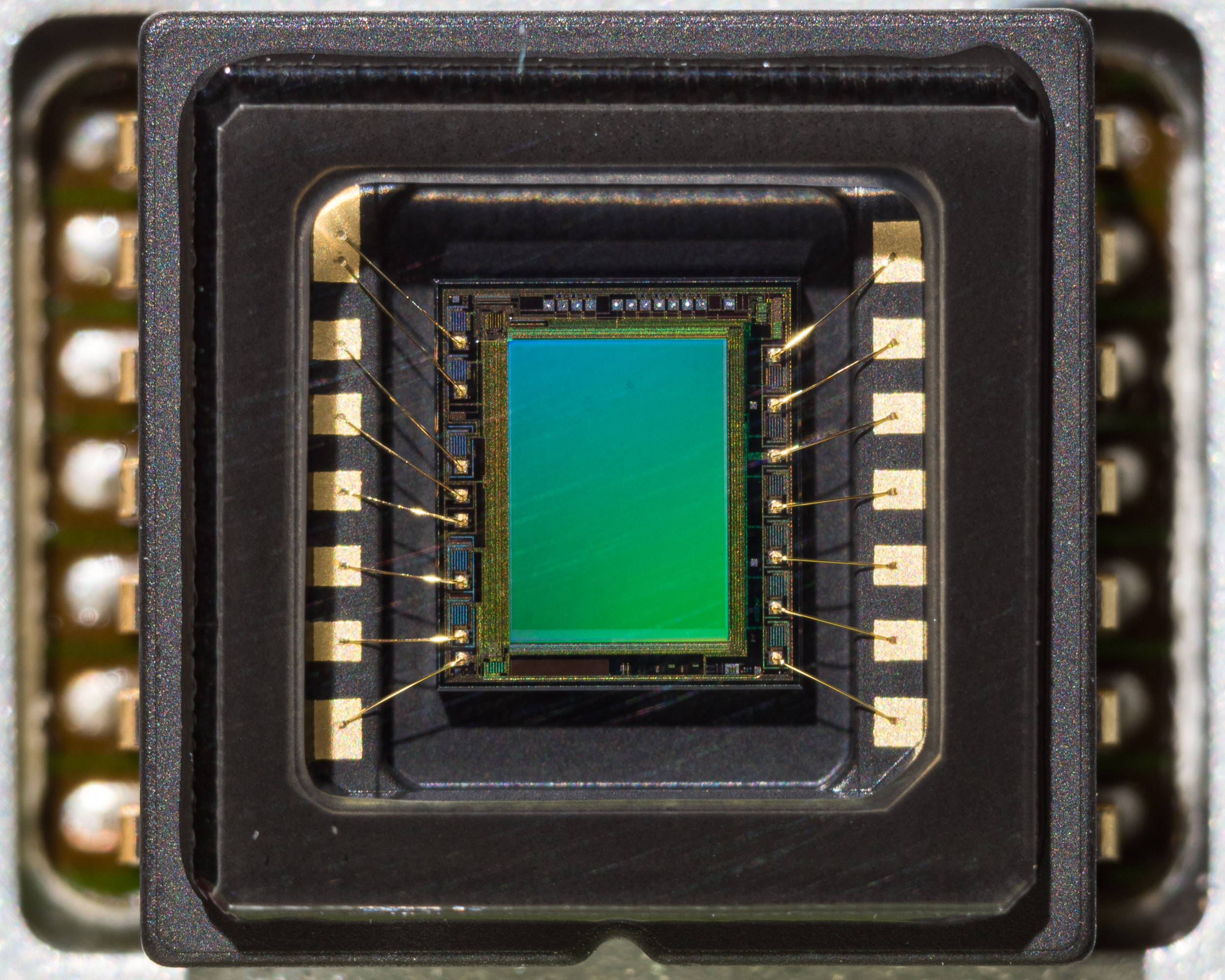
An old security camera CCD sensor

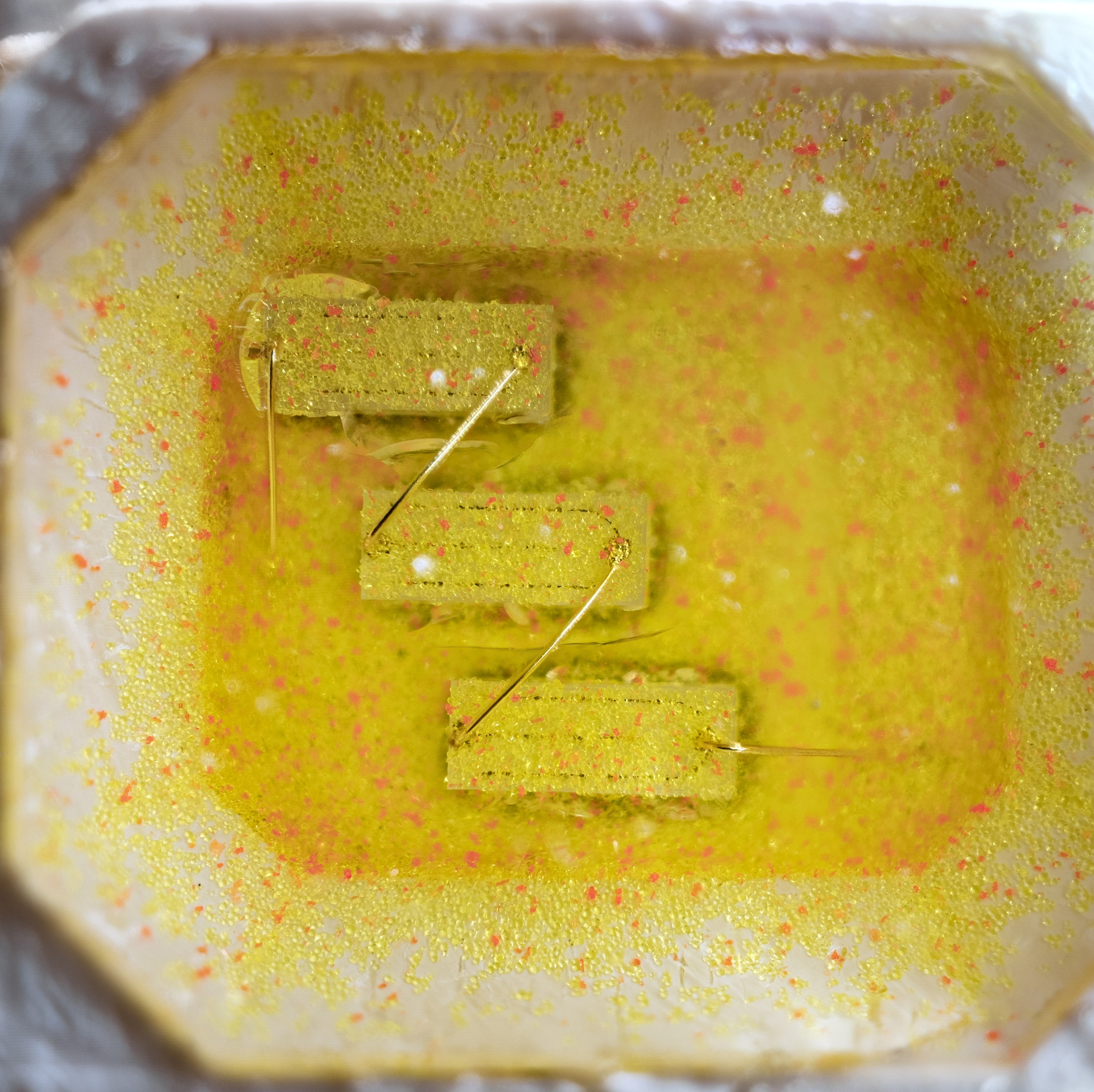
1-watt 9-volt SMD LED

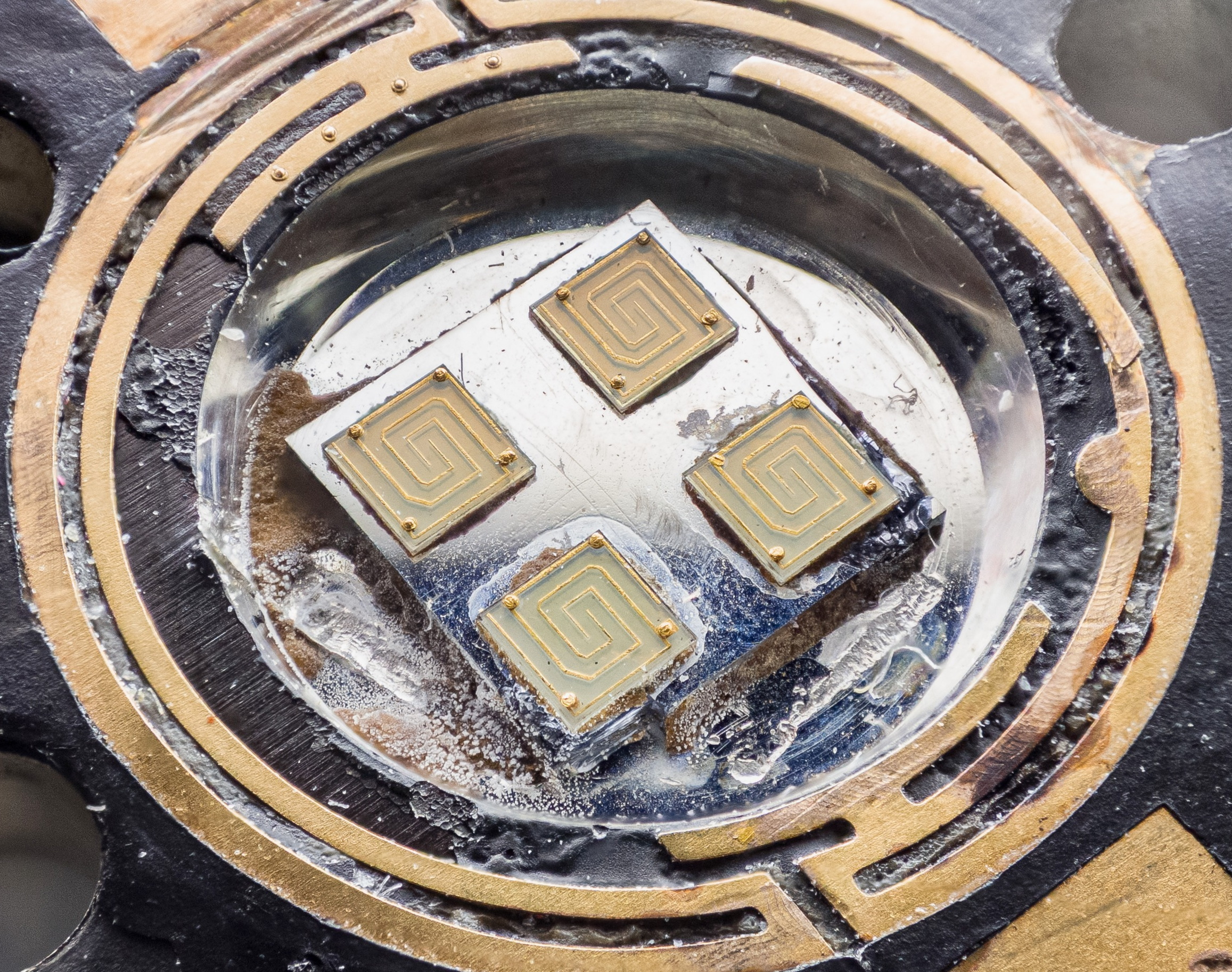
6-volt 3-watt power LED. Wire bonds damaged in removing phosphor.

== See also ==
- Die preparation
- Integrated circuit design
- Wire bonding and ball bonding
