= Avo (name) =

Male given name

Avo is a masculine given name and may refer to:

- Avo Keel (born 1962), Estonian volleyball player and coach
- Avo Keerend (1920–2012), Estonian printmaker, painter and illustrator
- Avo Kiir (born 1952), Estonian Lutheran clergyman and politician
- Avo Paistik (1936−2013), Estonian cartoonist, author, film director, painter and pastor
- Avo Sõmer (1934–2024), Estonian-American musicologist and composer
- Avo Üprus (born 1954), Estonian politician
- Avo Uvezian (1926–2017), American jazz pianist and cigar manufacturer
- Avo Viiol (born 1958), Estonian embezzler

== See also ==
- Aavo
