= Avo Photonics =

Avo Photonics, Inc.
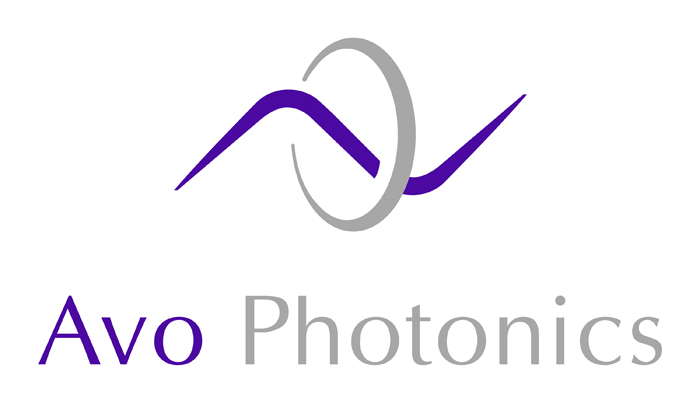
- Type: Contract manufacturing
- Industry: Photonics
- Founded: 2003
- Founder: Joseph L. Dallas, Ph.D.
- Headquarters: Horsham, PA
- Key people: Joseph L. Dallas (President); Tom Haslett (Chief Technology Officer); Jeff Perkins (Chief Operating Officer); Kimberly Wheeler (Chief Financial Officer)
- Number of employees: 400

Avo Photonics, Inc. is a service corporation that designs, develops, and manufactures private-label opto-electronic products for the medical, industrial, defense, aerospace, and communication markets.

The company headquarters is located in Horsham, PA, a suburb of Philadelphia, and consists of a 41,000 sq ft (3,800 m^{2}) manufacturing facility that features 16,000 sq ft (1,500 m^{2}) of clean room space.

Additional design verification is performed at Avo's satellite campus in Toronto, Ontario, and the company has European distributorship in Germany, France, Spain, the United Kingdom, Italy, and Norway.

== History ==
Avo Photonics was founded in 2003 by a group of engineers and laser physicists led by Dr. Joseph L. Dallas, co-creator of NASA's Space Lidar Technology Center. Avo was acquired by Halma, p.l.c., in 2011 as part of their global photonics division.

== Design and development capability ==
Avo Photonics' design and development capabilities include optical, mechanical, thermal, and electrical modeling and design integration, as well as prototyping and testing.

== Manufacturing capability ==
Avo Photonics is ISO 9001:2008-certified and ISO 13485:2003-certified. Its manufacturing capabilities include die bonding, laser welding, hermetic sealing, wire and ribbon bonding, fiber attach, vacuum packaging, and test and burn-in. In the past, Avo has manufactured such optical components and systems as diode-pumped solid-state lasers, fiber amplifiers, laser projector sources, high power isolators, tunable lasers, IR imagers, Lidar systems, Reagent photometers and space/airborne rangers.
