= Ernest Kirkendall =

American chemist and metallurgist (1914–2005)

- Born: July 6, 1914; East Jordan, Michigan, USA
- Died: August 22, 2005 (aged 91); Alexandria, Virginia
- Education: Wayne State University; University of Michigan
- Known for: Kirkendall effect
- Scientific career
- Fields: Metallurgy

Ernest Oliver Kirkendall (July 6, 1914 – August 22, 2005) was an American chemist and metallurgist. He is known for his 1947 discovery of the Kirkendall effect.

== Life and works ==
He was raised in Highland Park, Michigan and received his bachelor's from Wayne State University. His master's and PhD came from the University of Michigan, but he returned to Wayne to teach chemical engineering. In 1984 he was inducted into the College of Engineering's Hall of Fame. He died in a nursing home in Alexandria, Virginia.
