= Aavo =

Estonian male given name

- Gender: Male
- Language: Estonian
- Name day: 21 February

Origin
- Region of origin: Estonia

Other names
- Related names: Avo, Auvo

Aavo is an Estonian masculine given name. As of 1 January 2021, Aavo was the 220th most popular male name in Estonia. The name Aavo is the most common in Põlva County, where 12.12 per 10,000 inhabitants of the county bear the name.

Individuals bearing the name Aavo include:

- Aavo-Valdur Mikelsaar (born 1941), medical scientist and geneticist
- Aavo Mölder (born 1944), politician
- Aavo Ots (1951–2023), trumpet player, conductor and music teacher
- Aavo Pikkuus (born 1954), cyclist
- Aavo Põhjala (born 1957), judoka and judoka coach
- Aavo Sarap (born 1962), football coach
- Aavo Sillandi (1912–1983), footballer and coach
- Aavo Sirk (born 1945), physicist
