= Kirkendall effect =

Differential diffusion

The Kirkendall effect is the motion of the interface between two metals that occurs due to the difference in diffusion rates of the metal atoms. The effect can be observed, for example, by placing insoluble markers at the interface between a pure metal and an alloy containing that metal, and heating to a temperature where atomic diffusion is reasonable for the given timescale; the boundary will move relative to the markers.

This process was named after Ernest Kirkendall (1914–2005), assistant professor of chemical engineering at Wayne State University from 1941 to 1946. The paper describing the discovery of the effect was published in 1947.

The Kirkendall effect has important practical consequences. One of these is the prevention or suppression of voids formed at the boundary interface in various kinds of alloy-to-metal bonding. These are referred to as Kirkendall voids.

== History ==
The Kirkendall effect was discovered by Ernest Kirkendall and Alice Smigelskas in 1947, in the course of Kirkendall's ongoing research into diffusion in brass. The paper in which he discovered the famous effect was the third in his series of papers on brass diffusion, the first being his thesis. His second paper revealed that zinc diffused more quickly than copper in alpha-brass, which led to the research producing his revolutionary theory. Until this point, substitutional and ring methods were the dominant ideas for diffusional motion. Kirkendall's experiment produced evidence of a vacancy diffusion mechanism, which is the accepted mechanism to this day. At the time it was submitted, the paper and Kirkendall's ideas were rejected from publication by Robert Franklin Mehl, director of the Metals Research Laboratory at Carnegie Institute of Technology (now Carnegie Mellon University). Mehl refused to accept Kirkendall's evidence of this new diffusion mechanism and denied publication for over six months, only relenting after a conference was held and several other researchers confirmed Kirkendall's results.

=== Kirkendall's experiment ===
A bar of brass (70% Cu, 30% Zn) was used as a core, with molybdenum wires stretched along its length, and then coated in a layer of pure copper. Molybdenum was chosen as the marker material due to it being very insoluble in brass, eliminating any error due to the markers diffusing themselves. Diffusion was allowed to take place at 785 °C over the course of 56 days, with cross-sections being taken at six times throughout the span of the experiment. Over time, it was observed that the wire markers moved closer together as the zinc diffused out of the brass and into the copper. A difference in location of the interface was visible in cross sections of different times. Compositional change of the material from diffusion was confirmed by x-ray diffraction.

== Diffusion mechanism ==
Early diffusion models postulated that atomic motion in substitutional alloys occurs via a direct exchange mechanism, in which atoms migrate by switching positions with atoms on adjacent lattice sites. Such a mechanism implies that the atomic fluxes of two different materials across an interface must be equal, as each atom moving across the interface causes another atom to move across in the other direction.

Another possible diffusion mechanism involves lattice vacancies. An atom can move into a vacant lattice site, effectively causing the atom and the vacancy to switch places. If large-scale diffusion takes place in a material, there will be a flux of atoms in one direction and a flux of vacancies in the other.

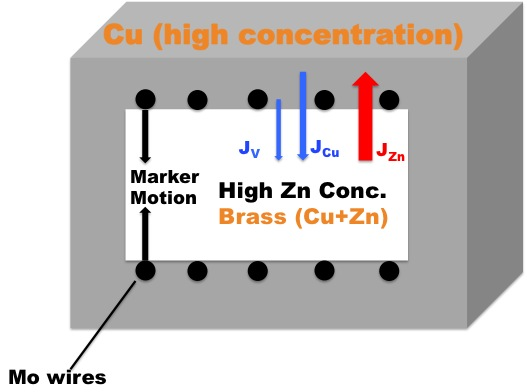
Demonstration of atomic fluxes in vacancy diffusion

The Kirkendall effect arises when two distinct materials are placed next to each other and diffusion is allowed to take place between them. In general, the diffusion coefficients of the two materials in each other are not the same. This is only possible if diffusion occurs by a vacancy mechanism; if the atoms instead diffused by an exchange mechanism, they would cross the interface in pairs, so the diffusion rates would be identical, contrary to observation. By Fick's 1st law of diffusion, the flux of atoms from the material with the higher diffusion coefficient will be larger, so there will be a net flux of atoms from the material with the higher diffusion coefficient into the material with the lower diffusion coefficient. To balance this flux of atoms, there will be a flux of vacancies in the opposite direction—from the material with the lower diffusion coefficient into the material with the higher diffusion coefficient—resulting in an overall translation of the lattice relative to the environment in the direction of the material with the lower diffusion constant.

Macroscopic evidence for the Kirkendall effect can be gathered by placing inert markers at the initial interface between the two materials, such as molybdenum markers at an interface between copper and brass. The diffusion coefficient of zinc is higher than the diffusion coefficient of copper in this case. Since zinc atoms leave the brass at a higher rate than copper atoms enter, the size of the brass region decreases as diffusion progresses. Relative to the molybdenum markers, the copper–brass interface moves toward the brass at an experimentally measurable rate.

=== Darken's equations ===
Shortly after the publication of Kirkendall's paper, L. S. Darken published an analysis of diffusion in binary systems much like the one studied by Smigelskas and Kirkendall. By separating the actual diffusive flux of the materials from the movement of the interface relative to the markers, Darken found the marker velocity $v$ to be
$$v = (D_1 - D_2) \frac{dN_1}{dx},$$
where $D_1$ and $D_2$ are the diffusion coefficients of the two materials, and $N_1$ is an atomic fraction. One consequence of this equation is that the movement of an interface varies linearly with the square root of time, which is exactly the experimental relationship discovered by Smigelskas and Kirkendall.

Darken also developed a second equation that defines a combined chemical diffusion coefficient $D$ in terms of the diffusion coefficients of the two interfacing materials:
$$D = N_1 D_2 + N_2 D_1.$$
This chemical diffusion coefficient can be used to mathematically analyze Kirkendall effect diffusion via the Boltzmann–Matano method.

== Kirkendall porosity ==
One important consideration deriving from Kirkendall's work is the presence of pores formed during diffusion. These voids act as sinks for vacancies, and when enough accumulate, they can become substantial and expand in an attempt to restore equilibrium. Porosity occurs due to the difference in diffusion rate of the two species.

Pores in metals have ramifications for mechanical, thermal, and electrical properties, and thus control over their formation is often desired. The equation
$$X^K = (a_1 \Delta C_1^\circ + a_2 \Delta C_2^\circ + \dots + a_{n-1} \Delta C_{n-1}^\circ)\sqrt{t},$$
where $X^K$ is the distance moved by a marker, $a$ is a coefficient determined by intrinsic diffusivities of the materials, and $\Delta C^\circ$ is a concentration difference between components, has proven to be an effective model for mitigating Kirkendall porosity. Controlling annealing temperature is another method of reducing or eliminating porosity. Kirkendall porosity typically occurs at a set temperature in a system, so annealing can be performed at lower temperatures for longer times to avoid formation of pores.

== Examples ==
In 1972, C. W. Horsting of the RCA Corporation published a paper which reported test results on the reliability of semiconductor devices in which the connections were made using aluminium wires bonded ultrasonically to gold-plated posts. His paper demonstrated the importance of the Kirkendall effect in wire bonding technology, but also showed the significant contribution of any impurities present to the rate at which precipitation occurred at the wire bonds. Two of the important contaminants that have this effect, known as Horsting effect (Horsting voids) are fluorine and chlorine. Both Kirkendall voids and Horsting voids are known causes of wire-bond fractures, though historically this cause is often confused with the purple-colored appearance of one of the five different gold–aluminium intermetallics, commonly referred to as "purple plague" and less often "white plague".

More recently the Kirkendall effect has become an important approach for making hollow nanostructures. When a nanocrystal is reacted with a second element that diffuses inwards slower than the nanocrystal's atoms diffuse outward, for example when a metal nanoparticle is oxidized or sulfidized, the imbalance in diffusion rates can leave a hollow cavity at the particle's core. This was first demonstrated in 2004, when cobalt nanocrystals were converted into hollow cobalt sulfide and cobalt selenide nanocrystals. The same approach has since been used for many other material systems. There may also be electric field assisted contributions as first pointed out for oxidation by Cabrera and Mott, and also what point defects can diffuse in the oxide or sulphide plays a role; see for instance recent texts on oxidation for further details.

== See also ==
- Electromigration
