= Avo Viiol =

Estonian criminal

Avo Viiol (sometimes also spelled as Aavo Viiol; born 5 August 1958) is a former head of Estonian Culture Fund and a famous Estonian embezzler.

Between December 1999 and August 2002, Viiol, then working as head of the Estonian Culture Fund, embezzled the Fund of 8,510,910 EEK, sometimes by forging expense documents, and caused 17,868 EEK of damages through unnecessary cash advance fees. On 14 August 2002, Estonian Internal Security Service arrested Viiol after the Estonian Ministry of Culture had detected suspicious activity regarding management of the Fund's assets. On 7 January 2003, the Tallinn City Court convicted Viiol of official forgery and grand embezzlement using the simple trial procedure (Estonian: lihtmenetlus). Viiol was sentenced to two years and eight months of imprisonment, then released prematurely in February 2004.

== Use of embezzled funds ==
According to Viiol, he lost most of the embezzled funds through playing in casinos, being a compulsive gambler. Ironically, a significant share of the Fund's resources comes from the gambling tax.

== Political ramifications ==
Viiol's conviction led to resignation of Signe Kivi, then Estonian Minister of Culture.

== Repayment ==
Viiol has made repeated promises to repay his embezzled funds and has refused to apply for personal bankruptcy. However, lacking major sources of income, it is unlikely that he will repay a significant part of them, and the Estonian Culture Fund has classified its claims against Viiol as unlikely. During the five years since his release, Viiol has repaid a total of EEK 23,382; assuming the same average payment rate, the debt would take about 1,820 years, or until 3824, to repay.

== Neologism ==
In the public discussion over Viiol's exploits, the neologism viioldama, a verb form of Viiol's name, has become a noted slang word for embezzlement. The word is similar to viiuldama, which means to play a violin.

== Sources ==
- Postimees 20 January 2004: Hasartmängur Avo Viiol pääseb vanglast kümne päeva pärast
- Baltic Times 1 November 2004: Diary of a notorious gambling fiend by Andrei Tuch
- SL Õhtuleht 23 October 2007: Riisumine viis vanglasse
- SL Õhtuleht 23 October 2007: Avo Viioli hiigelvõla tagasimaksed kultuurkapitalile kuivavad kokku
- Õhtuleht 2 December 2008: Avo Viiol pole tänavu tagasi maksnud sentigi
- Eesti Ekspress 25 March 2009: KOLM MEEST, kes miljonikahju kunagi ei hüvita: Simm, Tinn ja Viiol by Askur Alas
