= Wedge bonding =

Wedge bonding is a kind of wire bonding which relies on the application of ultrasonic power and force to form bonds. It is a popular method and is commonly used in the semiconductor industry. Wedge bonding is directional, so the bonding head rotates to accommodate the different angles for bonding. Due to this rotation, wedge bonding is slower than ball bonding. The advantage of wedge bonding is a finer pitch is possible. Wedge bonding also accommodates the use of metal ribbon instead of wire for bonding.

- Thermocompression Bonding (TCB): The technique uses heat and pressure to create a bond between a thin wire (typically aluminum or gold) and the bonding pads. As heat softens the wire, pressure is applied to form the bond.
- Ultrasonic Wedge Bonding (UWB): Ultrasonic energy is used in conjunction with pressure to create a bond between the wire and the bonding pads. This method is similar to thermos-sonic ball bonding but uses a wedge tool instead of a ball.
- Non-Ultrasonic Wedge Bonding: In this variation, wedge bonding is created without the use of ultrasonic energy.
