= Avos =

Avos may refer to:

- Avos, a tractate of the Jewish Talmud (commonly referred to as Pirkei Avos)
- Avos (ship), a ship in an expedition by Nikolai Rezanov which became a basis for the 1978 Russian rock opera Juno and Avos
  - Juno and Avos (opera)
- Avos, the plural for avo, which is 1/100 of a Macao pataca, a monetary unit of Macao
- AVOS Systems, an Internet company
- Russian avos', a Russian word describing a particular attitude to the course of events
- A Vision of Shadows, the sixth arc of the Warriors series
