= Gold–aluminium intermetallic =

Any intermetallic compound of gold and aluminium

A schematic cross-section of a purple plague in a wire-bond of gold wire on an aluminium pad. (1) Gold wire (2) Purple plague (3) Copper substrate (4) Gap eroded by wire-bond (5) Aluminium contact

Gold–aluminium intermetallic is a type of intermetallic compound of gold and aluminium that usually forms at contacts between the two metals. Gold–aluminium intermetallics have different properties from the individual metals, such as low conductivity and high melting point depending on their composition. Due to the difference of density between the metals and intermetallics, the growth of the intermetallic layers causes reduction in volume, and therefore creates gaps in the metal near the interface between gold and aluminium.

The production of gaps lowers the strength of the metal compound, which can cause mechanical failure at the joint, fostering the problems that the intermetallics cause in metal compounds. In microelectronics, these properties can cause problems in wire bonding.

The main compounds formed are usually Au_{5}Al_{2} (white plague) and AuAl_{2} (purple plague), both of which form at high temperatures, then Au_{5}Al_{2} and AuAl_{2} can further react with Au to form more stable compound, Au_{2}Al.

== Properties ==
A piece of "purple plague" gold (AuAl_{2}) enclosed in an ampoule

Gold–aluminium phase diagram

Au_{5}Al_{2} has low electrical conductivity and relatively low melting point. Au_{5}Al_{2}'s formation at the joint causes increase of electrical resistance, which can lead to electrical failure. Au_{5}Al_{2} typically forms at 95% of Au and 5% of Al by mass, its melting point is about 575 °C (1,067 °F), which is the lowest among the major gold-aluminum intermetallic compounds. AuAl_{2} is a brittle bright-purple compound, with a composition of about 78.5% Au and 21.5% Al by mass.

AuAl_{2} is the most thermally stable species of the Au–Al intermetallic compounds, with a melting point of 1,060 °C (1,940 °F) (see the Gold-aluminum phase diagram), which is similar to the melting point of pure gold. AuAl_{2} can react with Au, therefore is often replaced by Au_{2}Al, a tan-colored substance, which forms at composition of 93% of Au and 7% of Al by mass. It is also a poor conductor and can cause electrical failure of the joint, which can further lead to mechanical failure.

== Voiding ==
At lower temperatures, about 400–450 °C (752–842 °F), an interdiffusion process takes place at the junction, leading to formation of layers of different gold-aluminum intermetallic compounds with different growth rates. Gaps are formed as the denser and faster-growing layers consume the slower-growing layers. This process is known as the Kirkendall voiding, which leads to both increased electrical resistance and mechanical weakening of the wire bond. When the voids forms along the diffusion front, this process is aided by contaminants present in the lattice, and is known as the Horsting voiding, which is a similar process to the Kirkendall voiding.

== See also ==
- Colored gold
- Tin whiskers
