= Thermocompression bonding =

Thermocompression bonding describes a wafer bonding technique and is also referred to as diffusion bonding, pressure joining, thermocompression welding or solid-state welding. Two metals, e.g. gold-gold (Au), are brought into atomic contact applying force and heat simultaneously. The diffusion requires atomic contact between the surfaces due to the atomic motion. The atoms migrate from one crystal lattice to the other one based on crystal lattice vibration. This atomic interaction sticks the interface together. The diffusion process is described by the following three processes:

- surface diffusion
- grain boundary diffusion
- bulk diffusion

This method enables internal structure protecting device packages and direct electrical interconnect structures without additional steps beside the surface mounting process.

== Overview ==
The most established materials for thermocompression bonding are copper (Cu), gold (Au) and aluminium (Al) because of their high diffusion rates. In addition, aluminium and copper are relatively soft metals with good ductility.

Bonding with Al or Cu requires temperatures ≥ 400 °C to ensure sufficient hermetical sealing. Furthermore, aluminium needs extensive deposition and requires a high applied force to penetrate the surface oxide, as it is not able to penetrate through the oxide.

When using gold for diffusion, a temperature around 300 °C is needed to achieve a successful bond. Compared to Al or Cu, it does not form an oxide. This allows to skip a surface cleaning procedure before bonding.

Copper has the disadvantage that the damascene process is very extensive. It also immediately forms a surface oxide which can, however, be removed by formic acid vapor cleaning. Oxide removal doubles as surface passivation.

The diffusion of these metals requires good knowledge of the CTE differences between the two wafers to prevent resulting stress. Therefore, the temperature of both heaters needs to be matched and center-to-edge uniform for synchronized wafer expansion.

== Procedural steps ==
=== Pre-conditioning ===
Oxidation and impurities in the metal films affect the diffusion reactions by reducing the diffusion rates. Therefore, clean deposition practices and bonding with oxide removal and re-oxidation prevention steps are applied. The oxide layer removal can be realized by various oxide etch chemistry methods. Dry etching processes, i.e. formic acid vapor cleaning, are preferred based on the minimization of the immersion in fluids and the resulting etching of the passivation or the adhesion layer. Using the CMP process, which is especially for Cu and Al required, creates a planarized surface with micro roughness around several nanometres and enables the achievement of void-free diffusion bonds. Further, a surface treatment for organic removal, e.g. UV-ozone exposure, is possible.

Methods, i.e. plasma surface pretreatment, provide an accelerated diffusion rate based on an increased surface contact. Also the use of an ultra planarization step is considered to improve the bonding due to a reduction of material transport required for the diffusion. This improvement is based on a defined height Cu, Au and Sn.

=== Deposition ===
The metal films can be deposited by evaporation, sputtering or electroplating. Evaporation and sputtering, producing high quality films with limited impurities, are slow and hence used for micrometre and sub-micrometre layer thicknesses. The electroplating is commonly used for thicker films and needs careful monitoring and control of the film roughness and the layer purity.

The gold film can also be deposited on a diffusion barrier film, i.e. oxide or nitride. Also, an additional nano crystalline metal film, e.g. Ta, Cr, W, or Ti, can enhance the adhesion strength of the diffusion bond at decreased applied pressure and bonding temperature.

=== Bonding ===
The factors of the chosen temperature and applied pressure depend on the diffusion rate. The diffusion occurs between the crystal lattices by lattice vibration. Atoms can not leap over free space, i.e. contamination or vacancies. Beside the most rapid diffusion process (surface diffusion), the grain boundary and the bulk diffusion exist.

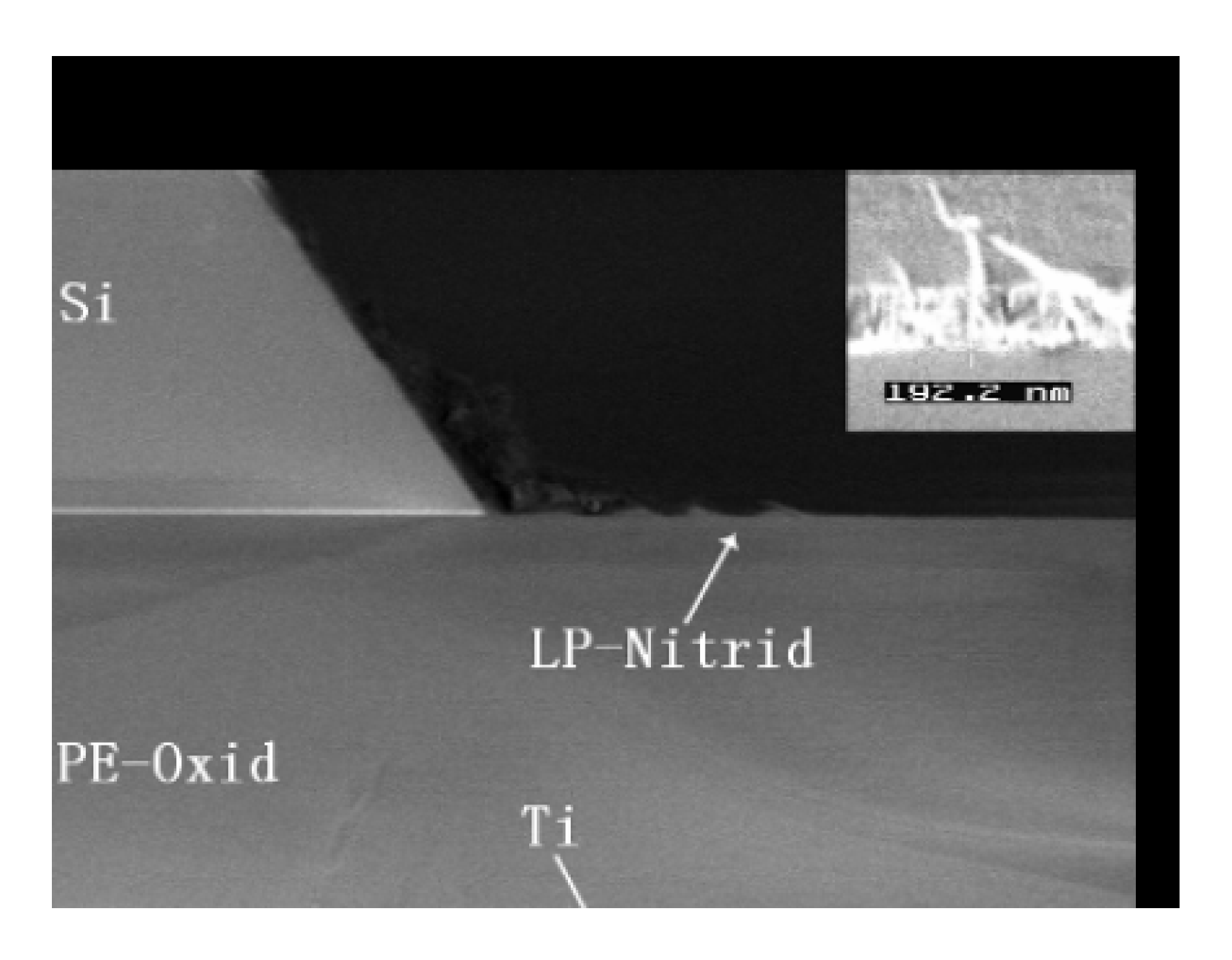
Ti-Si bonding interface.

Surface diffusion, also referred to as atomic diffusion, describes the process along the surface interface, when atoms move from surface to surface to free energy.

The grain boundary diffusion terms the free migration of atoms in free atomic lattice spaces. This is based on polycrystalline layers and its boundaries of incomplete matching of the atomic lattice and grains.

The diffusion through bulk crystal is the exchange of atoms or vacancies within the lattice that enables the mixing. The bulk diffusion starts at 30 to 50% of the materials melting point increasing exponentially with the temperature.

To enable the diffusion process, a high force is applied to plastically deform the surface asperities in the film, i.e. reducing bow and warp of the metal. Further, the applied force and its uniformity is important and depends on the wafer diameter and the metal density features. The high degree of force uniformity diminish the total force needed and alleviate the stress gradients and sensitivity to fragility. The bonding temperature can be lowered using a higher applied pressure and vice versa, considering that high pressure increases the chances of damage to the structural material or the films.

The bonding process itself takes place in a vacuum or forming gas environment, e.g. N_{2}. The pressure atmosphere supports the heat conduction and prevents thermal gradients vertically across the wafer and re-oxidation. Based on the difficult control of thermal expansion differences between the two wafers, precision alignment and high quality fixtures are used.

The bonding settings for the most established metals are following (for 200 mm wafers):

Aluminium (Al)
bonding temperature can be from 400 to 450 °C with an applied force above 70 kN for 20 to 45 min
Gold (Au)
bonding temperature is between 260 and 450 °C with an applied force above 40 kN for 20 to 45 min
Copper (Cu)
bonding temperature lies around 380 to 450 °C with an applied force between 20 and 80 kN for 20 to 60 min

== Examples ==
1. Thermocompression bonding is well established in the CMOS industry and realizes vertical integrated devices and production of wafer level packages with smaller form factors. This bonding procedure is used to produce pressure sensors, accelerometers, gyroscopes and RF MEMS.

2. Typically, thermocompression bonds are made with delivering heat and pressure to the mating surface by a hard faced bonding tool. Compliant bonding is a unique method of forming this type of solid state bond between a gold lead and a gold surface since heat and pressure is transmitted through a compliant or deformable media. The use of the compliant medium ensures the physical integrity of the lead by controlling the extent of wire deformation. The process also allows one to bond a multiple number of gold wires of various dimensions simultaneously since the compliant media ensures contacting and deforming all the lead wires.

== Technical specifications ==
Materials	Al; Au; Cu
Temperature	Al: ≥ 400 °C; Au: ≥ 260 °C; Cu: ≥ 380 °C
Advantages	localized heating; rapid cooling; good level of hermeticity
Drawbacks	extensive preparation of Al, Cu; extensive deposition of Al, Cu
Researches	Nano-rod Cu layers; Ultra planarization technology

== See also ==
- Compliant bonding
- Thermosonic bonding
