= Thermosonic bonding =

Used to connect microchips to bonding wires

Thermosonic bonding is widely used to wire bond silicon integrated circuits into computers. Alexander Coucoulas was named "Father of Thermosonic Bonding" by George Harman, the world's foremost authority on wire bonding, where he referenced Coucoulas's leading edge publications in his book, Wire Bonding In Microelectronics. Owing to the well proven reliability of thermosonic bonds, it is extensively used to connect the central processing units (CPUs), which are encapsulated silicon integrated circuits that serve as the "brains" of today's computers.

Thermosonic bonding is widely used to electrically connect silicon integrated circuit microprocessor chips into computers as well as a myriad of other electronic devices that require wire bonding.

As a result of Coucoulas introducing thermosonic bonding lead wires in the early 1960s, its applications and scientific investigations by researchers throughout the world have grown. The reliability of thermosonic bonding has made it the process of choice for connecting these crucially important electronic components. And since relatively low bonding parameters were shown to form reliable thermosonic bonds, the integrity of the fragile silicon integrated circuit chip central processor unit, or CPU, is assured throughout its intended lifetime use as the "brains" of the computer.

== Description ==
A thermosonic bond is formed using a set of parameters which include ultrasonic, thermal and mechanical (force) energies. A thermosonic bonding machine includes a magnetostrictive or piezoelectric-type transducer which is used to convert electrical energy into vibratory motion which is known as piezoelectricity. The vibratory motion travels along the coupler system, a portion which is tapered to serve as the velocity transformer. The velocity transformer amplifies the oscillatory motion and delivers it to a heated bonding tip. It is akin to a friction bond, since the introduction of ultrasonic energy (via a bonding tool vertically attached to an ultrasonic transformer or horn) simultaneously delivers a force and vibratory or scrubbing motion to the interfacial contact points between a pre-heated deforming lead-wire and the metallized pads of a silicon integrated circuit. In addition to the delivery of thermal energy, the transmission of ultrasonic vibratory energy creates an ultrasonic softening effect by interacting at the atomic lattice level of the preheated lead wire. These two softening effects dramatically facilitates the lead wire deformation by forming the desirable contact area using relatively low temperatures and forces. As a result of the frictional action and ultrasonic softening induced in the preheated lead wire during the bonding cycle, thermosonic bonding can be used to reliably bond high melting point lead wires (such as gold and lower cost aluminum and copper) using relatively low bonding parameters. This ensures that the fragile and costly silicon integrated circuit chip is not exposed to potentially damaging conditions by having to use higher bonding parameters (ultrasonic energy, temperatures or mechanical forces) to deform the lead wire in forming the required contact area during the bonding process.

== Background ==
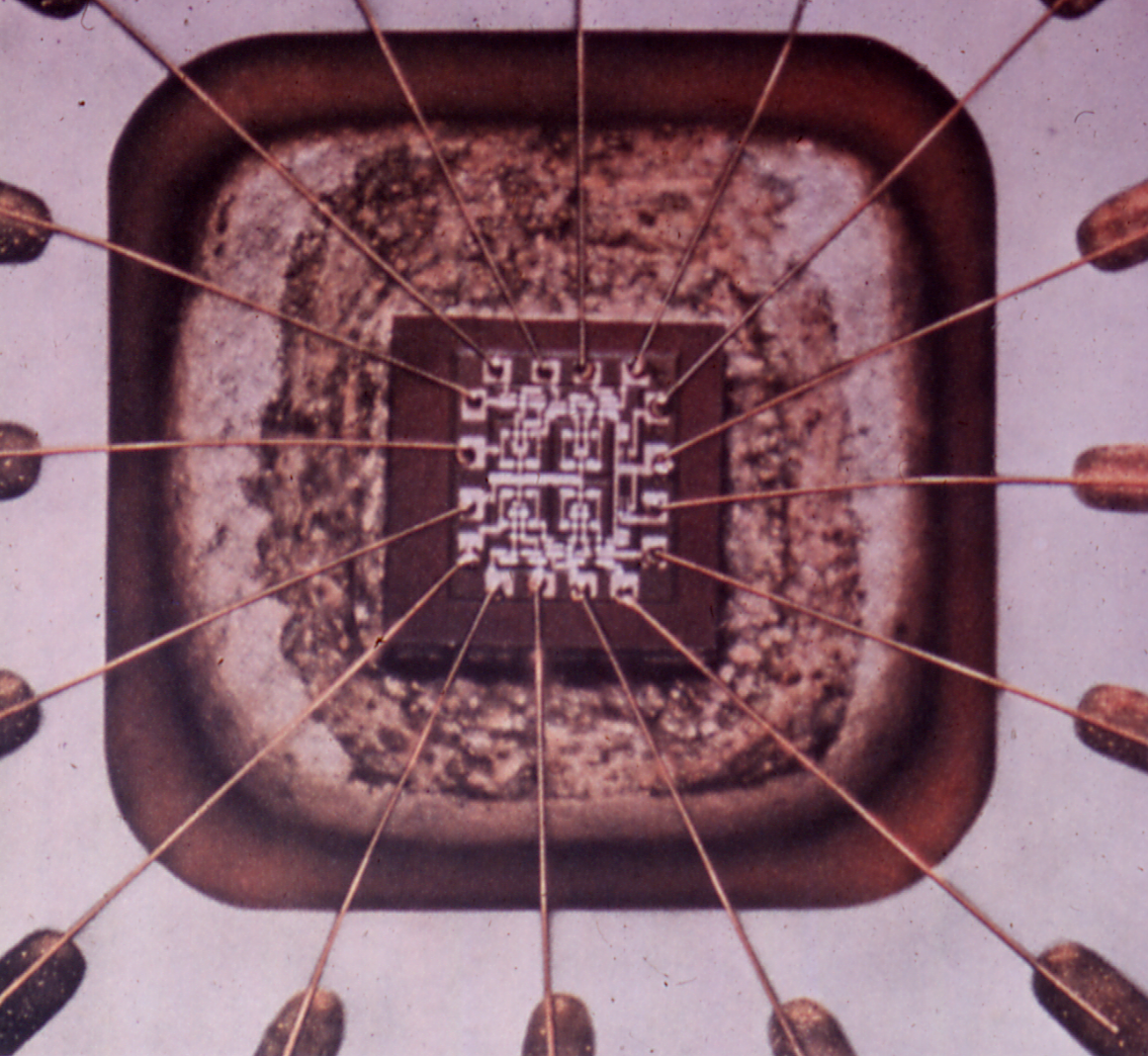
Wires connected between a lead frame (outside) and a silicon integrated circuit (inside) using thermosonic bonding

Initially referred to as Hot Work Ultrasonic Bonding by Alexander Coucoulas, thermosonic bonding falls in the category of a solid state metallic bond which is formed by mating two metal surfaces well below their respective melting points. Introduced by Coucoulas, thermosonic bonding significantly improved upon the bond-reliability achieved by available commercial solid-state bonding machines by pre-heating the lead wire (and/or metallized silicon chip) prior to introducing an ultrasonic energy cycle.

Thermosonic bonding was found to bond a wide range of conductive metals such as aluminum and copper wires to tantalum and palladium thin films deposited on aluminum oxide and glass substrates, all of which simulated the metallized silicon chip. In addition to thermal softening of the lead wire, the subsequent delivery of ultrasonic energy produced further softening by interacting at the atomic lattice level of the heated wire (known as ultrasonic softening). These two independent softening mechanisms eliminated the incidence of cracking in the fragile and costly silicon chip which was observed by Coucoulas when using earlier commercially available solid-state bonding machines. The improvement occurs because pre-heating and ultrasonic softening of the lead-wire dramatically eases deformation as to produce the required contact area using a relatively low set of bonding parameters. Depending on the temperature level and material properties of the lead wire, the onset of recrystallization (metallurgy) or hot working of the deforming wire can occur while it is forming the required contact area. Recrystallization takes place in the strain hardening region of the lead wire where it aids in the softening effect; if the wire was ultrasonically deformed at room temperature, it would face extensive strain hardening (cold working) and therefore tend to transmit damaging mechanical stresses to the silicon chip.

== Uses ==
At present, the majority of connections to the silicon integrated circuit chip are made using thermosonic bonding because it employs lower bonding temperatures, forces and dwell times than thermocompression bonding, as well as lower vibratory energy levels and forces than ultrasonic bonding to form the required bond area. Therefore the use of thermosonic bonding eliminates damaging the relatively fragile silicon integrated circuit chip during the bonding cycle. The proven reliability of thermosonic bonding has made it the process of choice, since such potential failure modes could be costly whether they occur during the manufacturing stage or detected later, during an operational field-failure of a chip which had been connected inside a computer or a myriad of other microelectronic devices.

Thermosonic bonding is also used in the flip chip process which is an alternate method of electrically connecting silicon integrated circuits.

Josephson effect and superconducting interference (DC SQUID) devices use the thermosonic bonding process as well. In this case, other bonding methods would degrade or even destroy YBaCuO_{7} microstructures, such as microbridges, Josephson junctions and superconducting interference devices (DC SQUID).

When electrically connecting light-emitting diodes with thermosonic bonding techniques, an improved performance of the device has been shown.

== See also ==
- Semiconductor device fabrication
- Transistor
- LED lamps
