= Radiation damage =

Effects of ionizing radiation

Radiation damage is the effect of ionizing radiation on physical objects including non-living structural materials. It can be either detrimental or beneficial for materials.

Radiobiology is the study of the action of ionizing radiation on living things, including the health effects of radiation in humans. High doses of ionizing radiation can cause damage to living tissue such as radiation burning and harmful mutations such as causing cells to become cancerous, and can lead to health problems such as radiation poisoning.

== Causes ==
This radiation may take several forms:

- Cosmic rays and subsequent energetic particles caused by their collision with the atmosphere and other materials.
- Radioactive daughter products (radioisotopes) caused by the collision of cosmic rays with the atmosphere and other materials, including living tissues.
- Energetic particle beams from a particle accelerator.
- Energetic particles or electro-magnetic radiation (X-rays) released from collisions of such particles with a target, as in an X ray machine or incidentally in the use of a particle accelerator.
- Particles or various types of rays released by radioactive decay of elements, which may be naturally occurring, created by accelerator collisions, or created in a nuclear reactor. They may be manufactured for therapeutic or industrial use or be released accidentally by nuclear accident, or released intentionally by a dirty bomb, or released into the atmosphere, ground, or ocean incidental to the explosion of a nuclear weapon for warfare or nuclear testing.

== Effects on materials and devices ==
Radiation may affect materials and devices in deleterious and beneficial ways:

- By causing the materials to become radioactive (mainly by neutron activation, or in presence of high-energy gamma radiation by photodisintegration).
- By nuclear transmutation of the elements within the material including, for example, the production of Hydrogen and Helium which can in turn alter the mechanical properties of the materials and cause swelling and embrittlement.
- By radiolysis (breaking chemical bonds) within the material, which can weaken it, cause it to swell, polymerize, promote corrosion, cause belittlements, promote cracking or otherwise change its desirable mechanical, optical, or electronic properties. On the other hand, radiolysis can also be used to induce crosslinking of polymers, which can harden them or make them more resistant to watering.
- By formation of reactive compounds, affecting other materials (e.g. ozone cracking by ozone formed by ionization of air).
- By ionization, causing electrical breakdown, particularly in semiconductors employed in electronic equipment, with subsequent currents introducing operation errors or even permanently damaging the devices. Devices intended for high radiation environments such as the nuclear industry and extra atmospheric (space) applications may be made radiation hard to resist such effects through design, material selection, and fabrication methods.
- By introducing dopants or defects by ion implantation to modify their electrical functionality in desired ways
- To treat cancer by electron, gamma or ion irradiation or via boron neutron capture therapy.

Many of the radiation effects on materials are produced by collision cascades and covered by radiation chemistry.

=== Effects on metals and concrete ===
Radiation can have harmful effects on solid materials as it can degrade their properties so that they are no longer mechanically sound. This is of special concern as it can greatly affect their ability to perform in nuclear reactors and is the emphasis of radiation material science, which seeks to mitigate this danger.

As a result of their usage and exposure to radiation, the effects on metals and concrete are particular areas of study. For metals, exposure to radiation can result in radiation hardening which strengthens the material while subsequently embrittling it (lowers toughness, allowing brittle fracture to occur). This occurs as a result of knocking atoms out of their lattice sites through both the initial interaction as well as a resulting cascade of damage, leading to the creation of defects, dislocations (similar to work hardening and precipitation hardening). Grain boundary engineering through thermomechanical processing has been shown to mitigate these effects by changing the fracture mode from intergranular (occurring along grain boundaries) to transgranular. This increases the strength of the material, mitigating the embrittling effect of radiation. Radiation can also lead to segregation and diffusion of atoms within materials, leading to phase segregation and voids as well as enhancing the effects of stress corrosion cracking through changes in both the water chemistry and alloy microstructure.

As concrete is used extensively in the construction of nuclear power plants, where it provides structure as well as containing radiation, the effect of radiation on it is also of major interest. During its lifetime, concrete will change properties naturally due to its normal aging process, however nuclear exposure will lead to a loss of mechanical properties due to swelling of the concrete aggregates, and thus damaging the bulk material. For instance, the biological shield of the reactor is frequently composed of Portland cement, where dense aggregates are added in order to decrease the radiation flux through the shield. These aggregates can swell and make the shield mechanically unsound. Numerous studies have shown decreases in both compressive and tensile strength as well as elastic modulus of concrete at around a dosage of around 10^{19} neutrons per square centimeter. These trends were also shown to exist in reinforced concrete, a composite of both concrete and steel.

The knowledge gained from current analyses of materials in fission reactors in regards to the effects of temperature, irradiation dosage, materials compositions, and surface treatments will be helpful in the design of future fission reactors as well as the development of fusion reactors.

Solids subject to radiation are constantly being bombarded with high energy particles. The interaction between particles, and atoms in the lattice of the reactor materials causes displacement in the atoms. Over the course of sustained bombardment, some of the atoms do not come to rest at lattice sites, which results in the creation of defects. These defects cause changes in the microstructure of the material, and ultimately result in a number of radiation effects.

==== Radiation damage event ====
1. Interaction of an energetic incident particle with a lattice atom
2. Transfer of kinetic energy to the lattice atom, giving birth to a primary displacement atom
3. Displacement of the atom from its lattice site
4. Movement of the atom through the lattice, creating additional displaced atoms
5. Production of displacement cascade (collection of point defects created by primary displacement atom)
6. Termination of displacement atom as an interstitial

==== Radiation cross section ====
The probability of an interaction between two atoms is dependent on the thermal neutron cross section (measured in barn). Given a macroscopic cross section of $\Sigma = \sigma \rho_A$ (where $\sigma$ is the microscopic cross section, and $\rho_A$ is the density of atoms in the target), and a reaction rate of $R = \Phi \Sigma = \Phi \sigma \rho_A$ (where $\Phi$ is the beam flux), the probability of interaction becomes $P\,dx = N_j \sigma(E_i) \, dx = \Sigma \, dx$. Listed below are the cross sections of common atoms or alloys.

Thermal Neutron Cross Sections (Barn)

Magnesium	0.059
Lead	0.17
Zirconium	0.18
Zircaloy-4	0.22
Aluminum	0.23
Iron	2.56
Austenitic Stainless Steel	3.1
Nickel	4.5
Titanium	6.1
Hafnium	104
Boron	750
Cadmium	2520
Gadolinium	48,890

==== Microstructural evolution under irradiation ====
Microstructural evolution is driven in the material by the accumulation of defects over a period of sustained radiation. This accumulation is limited by defect recombination, by clustering of defects, and by the annihilation of defects at sinks. Defects must thermally migrate to sinks, and in doing so often recombine, or arrive at sinks to recombine. In most cases, D_{rad} = D_{v}C_{v} + D_{i}C_{i} >> D_{therm}, that is to say, the motion of interstitials and vacancies throughout the lattice structure of a material as a result of radiation often outweighs the thermal diffusion of the same material.

One consequence of a flux of vacancies towards sinks is a corresponding flux of atoms away from the sink. If vacancies are not annihilated or recombined before collecting at sinks, they will form voids. At sufficiently high temperature, dependent on the material, these voids can fill with gases from the decomposition of the alloy, leading to swelling in the material. This is a tremendous issue for pressure sensitive or constrained materials that are under constant radiation bombardment, like pressurized water reactors. In many cases, the radiation flux is non-stoichiometric, which causes segregation within the alloy. This non-stoichiometric flux can result in significant change in local composition near grain boundaries, where the movement of atoms and dislocations is impeded. When this flux continues, solute enrichment at sinks can result in the precipitation of new phases.

==== Thermo-mechanical effects of irradiation ====
===== Hardening =====
Radiation hardening is the strengthening of the material in question by the introduction of defect clusters, impurity-defect cluster complexes, dislocation loops, dislocation lines, voids, bubbles and precipitates. For pressure vessels, the loss in ductility that occurs as a result of the increase in hardness is a particular concern.

===== Embrittlement =====
Radiation embrittlement results in a reduction of the energy to fracture, due to a reduction in strain hardening (as hardening is already occurring during irradiation). This is motivated for very similar reasons to those that cause radiation hardening; development of defect clusters, dislocations, voids, and precipitates. Variations in these parameters make the exact amount of embrittlement difficult to predict, but the generalized values for the measurement show predictable consistency.

===== Creep =====
Thermal creep in irradiated materials is negligible, by comparison to the irradiation creep, which can exceed 10^{−6}sec^{−1}. The mechanism is not enhanced diffusivities, as would be intuitive from the elevated temperature, but rather interaction between the stress and the developing microstructure. Stress induces the nucleation of loops, and causes preferential absorption of interstitials at dislocations, which results in swelling. Swelling, in combination with the embrittlement and hardening, can have disastrous effects on any nuclear material under substantial pressure.

===== Growth =====
Growth in irradiated materials is caused by Diffusion Anisotropy Difference (DAD). This phenomenon frequently occurs in zirconium, graphite, and magnesium because of natural properties.

===== Conductivity =====
Thermal and electrical conductivity rely on the transport of energy through the electrons and the lattice of a material. Defects in the lattice and substitution of atoms via transmutation disturb these pathways, leading to a reduction in both types of conduction by radiation damage. The magnitude of reduction depends on the dominant type of conductivity (electronic or Wiedemann–Franz law, phononic) in the material and the details of the radiation damage and is therefore still hard to predict.

=== Effects on polymers ===
Radiation damage can affect polymers that are found in nuclear reactors, medical devices, electronic packaging, and aerospace parts, as well as polymers that undergo sterilization or irradiation for use in food and pharmaceutical industries. Ionizing radiation can also be used to intentionally strengthen and modify the properties of polymers. Research in this area has focused on the three most common sources of radiation used for these applications, including gamma, electron beam, and x-ray radiation.

The mechanisms of radiation damage are different for polymers and metals, since dislocations and grain boundaries do not have real significance in a polymer. Instead, polymers deform via the movement and rearrangement of chains, which interact through Van der Waals forces and hydrogen bonding. In the presence of high energy, such as ionizing radiation, the covalent bonds that connect the polymer chains themselves can overcome their forces of attraction to form a pair of free radicals. These radicals then participate in a number of polymerization reactions that fall under the classification of radiation chemistry. Crosslinking describes the process through which carbon-centered radicals on different chains combine to form a network of crosslinks. In contrast, chain scission occurs when a carbon-centered radical on the polymer backbone reacts with another free radical, typically from oxygen in the atmosphere, causing a break in the main chain. Free radicals can also undergo reactions that graft new functional groups onto the backbone, or laminate two polymer sheets without an adhesive.

There is contradictory information about the expected effects of ionizing radiation for most polymers, since the conditions of radiation are so influential. For example, dose rate determines how fast free radicals are formed and whether they are able to diffuse through the material to recombine, or participate in chemical reactions. The ratio of crosslinking to chain scission is also affected by temperature, environment, presence of oxygen versus inert gases, radiation source (changing the penetration depth), and whether the polymer has been dissolved in an aqueous solution.

Crosslinking and chain scission have diverging effects on mechanical properties. Irradiated polymers typically undergo both types of reactions simultaneously, but not necessarily to the same extent. Crosslinks strengthen the polymer by preventing chain sliding, effectively leading to thermoset behavior. Crosslinks and branching lead to higher molecular weight and polydispersity. Thus, these polymers will generally have increased stiffness, tensile strength, and yield strength, and decreased solubility. Polyethylene is well known to experience improved mechanical properties as a result of crosslinking, including increased tensile strength and decreased elongation at break. Thus, it has "several advantageous applications in areas as diverse as rock bolts for mining, reinforcement of concrete, manufacture of light weight high strength ropes and high performance fabrics."

In contrast, chain scission reactions will weaken the material by decreasing the average molecular weight of the chains, such that tensile and flexural strength decrease and solubility increases. Chain scission occurs primarily in the amorphous regions of the polymer. It can increase crystallinity in these regions by making it easier for the short chains to reassemble. Thus, it has been observed that crystallinity increases with dose, leading to a more brittle material on the macroscale. In addition, "gaseous products, such as CO_{2}, may be trapped in the polymer, and this can lead to subsequent crazing and cracking due to accumulated local stresses." An example of this phenomenon is 3D printed materials, which are often porous as a result of their printing configuration. Oxygen can diffuse into the pores and react with the surviving free radicals, leading to embrittlement. Some materials continue to weaken through aging, as the remaining free radicals react.

The resistance of these polymers to radiation damage can be improved by grafting or copolymerizing aromatic groups, which enhance stability and decrease reactivity, and by adding antioxidants and nanomaterials, which act as free radical scavengers. In addition, higher molecular weight polymers will be more resistant to radiation.

=== Effects on gases ===
Exposure to radiation causes chemical changes in gases. The least susceptible to damage are noble gases, where the major concern is the nuclear transmutation with follow-up chemical reactions of the nuclear reaction products.

High-intensity ionizing radiation in air can produce a visible ionized air glow of telltale bluish-purplish color. The glow can be observed e.g. during criticality accidents, around mushroom clouds shortly after a nuclear explosion, or inside of a damaged nuclear reactor like during the Chernobyl disaster.

Significant amounts of ozone can be produced. Even small amounts of ozone can cause ozone cracking in many polymers over time, in addition to the damage by the radiation itself.

==== Gas-filled radiation detectors ====
In some gaseous ionisation detectors, radiation damage to gases plays an important role in the device's ageing, especially in devices exposed for long periods to high intensity radiation, e.g. detectors for the Large Hadron Collider or the Geiger–Müller tube

Ionization processes require energy above 10 eV, while splitting covalent bonds in molecules and generating free radicals requires only 3-4 eV. The electrical discharges initiated by the ionization events by the particles result in plasma populated by large amount of free radicals. The highly reactive free radicals can recombine back to original molecules, or initiate a chain of free-radical polymerization reactions with other molecules, yielding compounds with increasing molecular weight. These high molecular weight compounds then precipitate from gaseous phase, forming conductive or non-conductive deposits on the electrodes and insulating surfaces of the detector and distorting its response. Gases containing hydrocarbon quenchers, e.g. argon–methane, are typically sensitive to aging by polymerization; addition of oxygen tends to lower the aging rates. Trace amounts of silicone oils, present from outgassing of silicone elastomers and especially from traces of silicone lubricants, tend to decompose and form deposits of silicon crystals on the surfaces. Gaseous mixtures of argon (or xenon) with carbon dioxide and optionally also with 2-3% of oxygen are highly tolerant to high radiation fluxes. The oxygen is added as noble gas with carbon dioxide has too high transparency for high-energy photons; ozone formed from the oxygen is a strong absorber of ultraviolet photons. Carbon tetrafluoride can be used as a component of the gas for high-rate detectors; the fluorine radicals produced during the operation however limit the choice of materials for the chambers and electrodes (e.g. gold electrodes are required, as the fluorine radicals attack metals, forming fluorides). Addition of carbon tetrafluoride can however eliminate the silicon deposits. Presence of hydrocarbons with carbon tetrafluoride leads to polymerization. A mixture of argon, carbon tetrafluoride, and carbon dioxide shows low aging in high hadron flux.

=== Effects on liquids ===
Like gases, liquids lack fixed internal structure; the effects of radiation is therefore mainly limited to radiolysis, altering the chemical composition of the liquids. As with gases, one of the primary mechanisms is formation of free radicals.

All liquids are subject to radiation damage, with few exotic exceptions; e.g. molten sodium, where there are no chemical bonds to be disrupted, and liquid hydrogen fluoride, which produces gaseous hydrogen and fluorine, which spontaneously react back to hydrogen fluoride.

==== Effects on water ====
Water subjected to ionizing radiation forms free radicals of hydrogen and hydroxyl, which can recombine to form gaseous hydrogen, oxygen, hydrogen peroxide, hydroxyl radicals, and peroxide radicals. In living organisms, which are composed mostly of water, majority of the damage is caused by the reactive oxygen species, free radicals produced from water. The free radicals attack the biomolecules forming structures within the cells, causing oxidative stress (a cumulative damage which may be significant enough to cause the cell death, or may cause DNA damage possibly leading to cancer).

In cooling systems of nuclear reactors, the formation of free oxygen would promote corrosion and is counteracted by addition of hydrogen to the cooling water. The hydrogen is not consumed as for each molecule reacting with oxygen one molecule is liberated by radiolysis of water; the excess hydrogen just serves to shift the reaction equilibriums by providing the initial hydrogen radicals. The reducing environment in pressurized water reactors is less prone to the buildup of oxidative species. The chemistry of boiling water reactor coolant is more complex, as the environment can be oxidizing. Most of the radiolytic activity occurs in the core of the reactor where the neutron flux is highest; the bulk of energy is deposited in water from fast neutrons and gamma radiation, the contribution of thermal neutrons is much lower. In air-free water, the concentration of hydrogen, oxygen, and hydrogen peroxide reaches steady state at about 200 Gy of radiation. In presence of dissolved oxygen, the reactions continue until the oxygen is consumed and the equilibrium is shifted. Neutron activation of water leads to the buildup of low concentrations of nitrogen species; due to the oxidizing effects of the reactive oxygen species, these tend to be present in the form of nitrate anions. In reducing environments, ammonia may be formed. Ammonia ions may be however also subsequently oxidized to nitrates. Other species present in the coolant water are the oxidized corrosion products (e.g. chromates) and fission products (e.g. pertechnetate and periodate anions, uranyl and neptunyl cations). Absorption of neutrons in hydrogen nuclei leads to the buildup of deuterium and tritium in the water. Behavior of supercritical water, important for the supercritical water reactors, differs from the radiochemical behavior of liquid water and steam and is currently under investigation.

The magnitude of the effects of radiation on water is dependent on the type and energy of the radiation, namely its linear energy transfer. A gas-free water subjected to low-LET gamma rays yields almost no radiolysis products and sustains an equilibrium with their low concentration. High-LET alpha radiation produces larger amounts of radiolysis products. In presence of dissolved oxygen, radiolysis always occurs. Dissolved hydrogen completely suppresses radiolysis by low-LET radiation while radiolysis still occurs with

The presence of reactive oxygen species has strongly disruptive effect on dissolved organic chemicals. This is exploited in groundwater remediation by electron beam treatment.

== Countermeasures ==
Two main approaches to reduce radiation damage are reducing the amount of energy deposited in the sensitive material (e.g. by shielding, distance from the source, or spatial orientation), or modification of the material to be less sensitive to radiation damage (e.g. by adding antioxidants, stabilizers, or choosing a more suitable material). In addition to the electronic device hardening mentioned above, some degree of protection may be obtained by shielding, usually with the interposition of high density materials (particularly lead, where space is critical, or concrete where space is available) between the radiation source and areas to be protected. For biological effects of substances such as radioactive iodine the ingestion of non-radioactive isotopes may substantially reduce the biological uptake of the radioactive form, and chelation therapy may be applied to accelerate the removal of radioactive materials formed from heavy metals from the body by natural processes.

=== For solid radiation damage ===
Solid countermeasures to radiation damage consist of three approaches. Firstly, saturating the matrix with oversized solutes. This acts to trap the swelling that occurs as a result of the creep and dislocation motion. They also act to help prevent diffusion, which restricts the ability of the material to undergo radiation induced segregation. Secondly, dispersing an oxide inside the matrix of the material. Dispersed oxide helps to prevent creep, and to mitigate swelling and reduce radiation induced segregation as well, by preventing dislocation motion and the formation and motion of interstitials. Finally, by engineering grain boundaries to be as small as possible, dislocation motion can be impeded, which prevents the embrittlement and hardening that result in material failure.

== Effects on humans ==
Ionizing radiation is generally harmful and potentially lethal to living things but can have health benefits in radiation therapy for the treatment of cancer and thyrotoxicosis. Its most common impact is the induction of cancer with a latent period of years or decades after exposure. High doses can cause visually dramatic radiation burns, and/or rapid fatality through acute radiation syndrome. Controlled doses are used for medical imaging and radiotherapy.

Most adverse health effects of radiation exposure may be grouped in two general categories:

- Deterministic effects (harmful tissue reactions) due in large part to the killing or malfunction of cells following high doses; and
- Stochastic effects, i.e., cancer and heritable effects involving either cancer development in exposed individuals owing to mutation of somatic cells or heritable disease in their offspring owing to mutation of reproductive (germ) cells.

== See also ==
- Radiation material science
- Stopping power (particle radiation)
- Collision cascade
- Ion track
- Radiation hardening
- Radiation Damage in Metals and Alloys
