= Radiation material science =

Study of the interactions between radiation and matter

Radiation materials science is a subfield of materials science which studies the interaction of radiation with matter: a broad subject covering many forms of irradiation and of matter.

== Main aim of radiation material science ==
Some of the most profound effects of irradiation on materials occur in the core of nuclear power reactors where atoms comprising the structural components are displaced numerous times over the course of their engineering lifetimes. The consequences of radiation to core components includes changes in shape and volume by tens of percent, increases in hardness by factors of five or more, severe reduction in ductility and increased embrittlement, and susceptibility to environmentally induced cracking. For these structures to fulfill their purpose, a firm understanding of the effect of radiation on materials is required in order to account for irradiation effects in design, to mitigate its effect by changing operating conditions, or to serve as a guide for creating new, more radiation-tolerant materials that can better serve their purpose.

== Radiation ==
The types of radiation that can alter structural materials are neutron radiation, ion beams, electrons (beta particles), and gamma rays. All of these forms of radiation have the capability to displace atoms from their lattice sites, which is the fundamental process that drives the changes in structural metals. The inclusion of ions among the irradiating particles provides a tie-in to other fields and disciplines such as the use of accelerators for the transmutation of nuclear waste, or in the creation of new materials by ion implantation, ion beam mixing, plasma-assisted ion implantation, and ion beam-assisted deposition.

The effect of irradiation on materials is rooted in the initial event in which an energetic projectile strikes a target. While the event is made up of several steps or processes, the primary result is the displacement of an atom from its lattice site. Irradiation displaces an atom from its site, leaving a vacant site behind (a vacancy) and the displaced atom eventually comes to rest in a location that is between lattice sites, becoming an interstitial atom. The vacancy-interstitial pair is central to radiation effects in crystalline solids and is known as a Frenkel pair. The presence of the Frenkel pair and other consequences of irradiation damage determine the physical effects, and with the application of stress, the mechanical effects of irradiation by the occurring of interstitial, phenomena, such as swelling, growth, phase transition, segregation, etc., will be effected. In addition to the atomic displacement, an energetic charged particle moving in a lattice also gives energy to electrons in the system, via the electronic stopping power. This energy transfer can also be for high-energy particles produce damage in non-metallic materials, such as ion tracks and fission tracks in minerals.

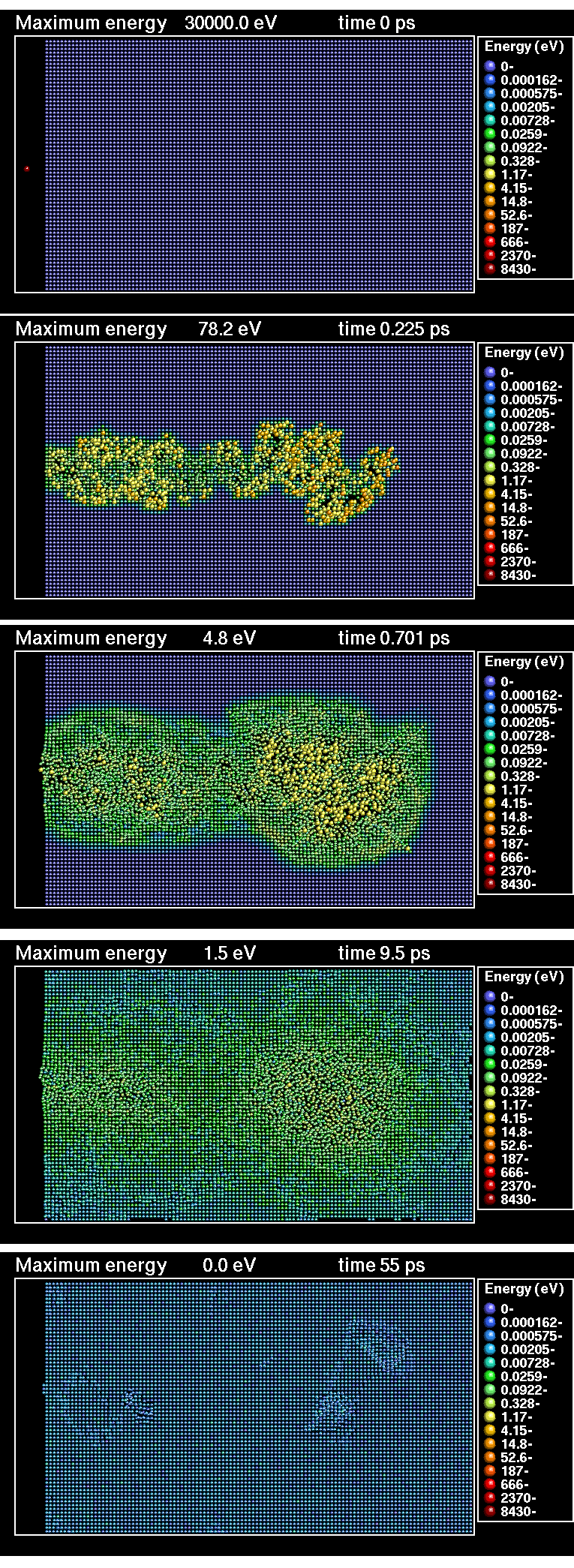
Image sequence of the time development of a collision cascade in the heat spike regime produced by a 30 keV Xe ion impacting on Au under channeling conditions. The image is produced by a classical molecular dynamics simulation of a collision cascade. The image shows a cross section of two atomic layers in the middle of a threedimensional simulation cell. Each sphere illustrates the position of an atom, and the colors show the kinetic energy of each atom as indicated by the scale on the right. At the end, both point defects and dislocation loops remain.

== Radiation damage ==
The radiation damage event is defined as the transfer of energy from an incident projectile to the solid and the resulting distribution of target atoms after completion of the event. This event is composed of several distinct processes:

1. The interaction of an energetic incident particle with a lattice atom
2. The transfer of kinetic energy to the lattice atom giving birth to a primary knock-on atom
3. The displacement of the atom from its lattice site
4. The passage of the displaced atom through the lattice and the accompanying creation of additional knock-on atoms
5. The production of a displacement cascade (collection of point defects created by the primary knock-on atom)
6. The termination of the primary knock-on atom as an interstitial

The result of a radiation damage event is, if the energy given to a lattice atom is above the threshold displacement energy, the creation of a collection of point defects (vacancies and interstitials) and clusters of these defects in the crystal lattice.

The essence of the quantification of radiation damage in solids is the number of displacements per unit volume per unit time $R$ :

$$R = N \int_{E_{min}}^{E_{max}} \int_{T_{min}}^{T_{max}} \phi(E_i)\,\sigma(E_i,T)\,\upsilon(T)\,dT\,dE_i.$$

where $N$ is the atom number density, $E_{max}$ and $E_{min}$ are the maximum and minimum energies of the incoming particle, $\phi(E_i)$ is the energy dependent particle flux, $T_{max}$ and $T_{min}$ are the maximum and minimum energies transferred in a collision of a particle of energy $E_i$ and a lattice atom, $\sigma(E_i,T)$ is the cross section for the collision of a particle of energy $E_i$ that results in a transfer of energy $T$ to the struck atom, $\upsilon(T)$ is the number of displacements per primary knock-on atom.

The two key variables in this equation are $\sigma(E_i,T)$ and $\upsilon(T)$. The term $\sigma(E_i,T)$ describes the transfer of energy from the incoming particle to the first atom it encounters in the target, the primary knock-on atom; The second quantity $\upsilon(T)$ is the total number of displacements that the primary knock-on atom goes on to make in the solid; Taken together, they describe the total number of displacements caused by an incoming particle of energy $E_i$, and the above equation accounts for the energy distribution of the incoming particles. The result is the total number of displacements in the target from a flux of particles with a known energy distribution.

In radiation material science the displacement damage in the alloy ( $\left[ dpa \right]$ = displacements per atom in the solid ) is a better representation of the effect of irradiation on materials properties than the fluence ( neutron fluence, $\left[ MeV \right]$ ).

See also Wigner effect.

== Radiation-resistant materials ==
To generate materials that fit the increasing demands of nuclear reactors to operate with higher efficiency or for longer lifetimes, materials must be designed with radiation resistance in mind. In particular, Generation IV nuclear reactors operate at higher temperatures and pressures compared to modern pressurized water reactors, which account for a vast amount of western reactors. This leads to increased vulnerability to normal mechanical failure in terms of creep resistance as well as radiation damaging events such as neutron-induced swelling and radiation-induced segregation of phases. By accounting for radiation damage, reactor materials would be able to withstand longer operating lifetimes. This allows reactors to be decommissioned after longer periods of time, improving return on investment of reactors without compromising safety. This is of particular interest in developing commercial viability of advanced and theoretical nuclear reactors, and this goal can be accomplished through engineering resistance to these displacement events.

=== Grain boundary engineering ===
Face-centered cubic metals such as austenitic steels and Ni-based alloys can benefit greatly from grain boundary engineering. Grain boundary engineering attempts to generate higher amounts of special grain boundaries, characterized by favorable orientations between grains. By increasing populations of low energy boundaries without increasing grain size, fracture mechanics of these face centered cubic metals can be changed to improve mechanical properties given a similar displacements per atom value versus non grain boundary engineered alloys. This method of treatment in particular yields better resistance to stress corrosion cracking and oxidation.

=== Materials selection ===
By using advanced methods of material selection, materials can be judged on criteria such as neutron-absorption cross sectional area. Selecting materials with minimum neutron-absorption can heavily minimize the number of displacements per atom that occur over a reactor material's lifetime. This slows the radiation embrittlement process by preventing mobility of atoms in the first place, proactively selecting materials that do not interact with the nuclear radiation as frequently. This can have a huge impact on total damage especially when comparing the materials of modern advanced reactors of zirconium to stainless steel reactor cores, which can differ in absorption cross section by an order of magnitude from more-optimal materials.

Example values for thermal neutron cross section are shown in the table below.

Element	Thermal neutron cross section (barns)
Magnesium	0.059
Lead	0.17
Zirconium	0.18
Aluminum	0.23
Iron	2.56
Austenitic Stainless Steel	3.1
Nickel	4.5
Titanium	6.1
Cadmium	2520

=== Short range order (SRO) self-organization ===
For nickel-chromium and iron-chromium alloys, short range order can be designed on the nano-scale (<5 nm) that absorbs the interstitial and vacancy's generated by primary knock-on atom events. This allows materials that mitigate the swelling that normally occurs in the presence of high displacements per atom and keep the overall volume percent change under the ten percent range. This occurs through generating a metastable phase that is in constant, dynamic equilibrium with surrounding material. This metastable phase is characterized by having an enthalpy of mixing that is effectively zero with respect to the main lattice. This allows phase transformation to absorb and disperse the point defects that typically accumulate in more rigid lattices. This extends the life of the alloy through making vacancy and interstitial creation less successful as constant neutron excitement in the form of displacement cascades transform the SRO phase, while the SRO reforms in the bulk solid solution.

== Resources ==
- Fundamentals of Radiation Material Science: Metals and Alloys, 2nd Ed, Gary S. Was, SpringerNature, New York 2017
- R. S. Averback and T. Diaz de la Rubia (1998). "Displacement damage in irradiated metals and semiconductors". In H. Ehrenfest and F. Spaepen. Solid State Physics 51. Academic Press. pp. 281–402.
- R. Smith, ed. (1997). Atomic & ion collisions in solids and at surfaces: theory, simulation and applications. Cambridge University Press. ISBN 0-521-44022-X.
