= Collision cascade =

Series of collisions between nearby atoms, initiated by a single energetic atom

A classical molecular dynamics computer simulation of a collision cascade in gold induced by a 10 keV Au self-recoil. This is a typical case of a collision cascade in the heat spike regime. Each small sphere illustrates the position of an atom, in a 2-atom-layer-thick cross section of a three-dimensional simulation cell. The colors show (on a logarithmic scale) the kinetic energy of the atoms, with white and red being high kinetic energy from 10 keV downwards, and blue being low.

In condensed-matter physics, a collision cascade (also known as a displacement cascade or a displacement spike) is a set of nearby adjacent energetic (much higher than ordinary thermal energies) collisions of atoms induced by an energetic particle in a solid or liquid.

If the maximum atom or ion energies in a collision cascade are higher than the threshold displacement energy of the material (tens of eVs or more), the collisions can permanently displace atoms from their lattice sites and produce defects. The initial energetic atom can be, e.g., an ion from a particle accelerator, an atomic recoil produced by a passing high-energy neutron, electron or photon, or be produced when a radioactive nucleus decays and gives the atom a recoil energy.

The characteristics of collision cascades can vary greatly depending on the energy and mass of the recoil or incoming ion, as well as the material's density (stopping power).

== Linear cascades ==
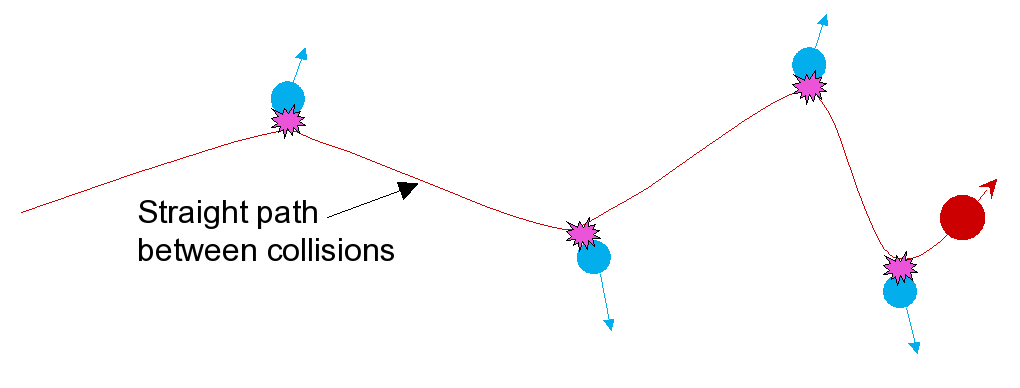
Schematic illustration of independent binary collisions between atoms

When the initial recoil/ion mass is low, and the material where the cascade occurs has a low density (i.e. the recoil-material combination has a low stopping power), the collisions between the initial recoil and sample atoms occur rarely, and can be understood well as a sequence of independent binary collisions between atoms. This kind of cascade can be theoretically well treated using the binary collision approximation (BCA) simulation approach. For instance, H and He ions with energies below 10 keV can be expected to lead to purely linear cascades in all materials.

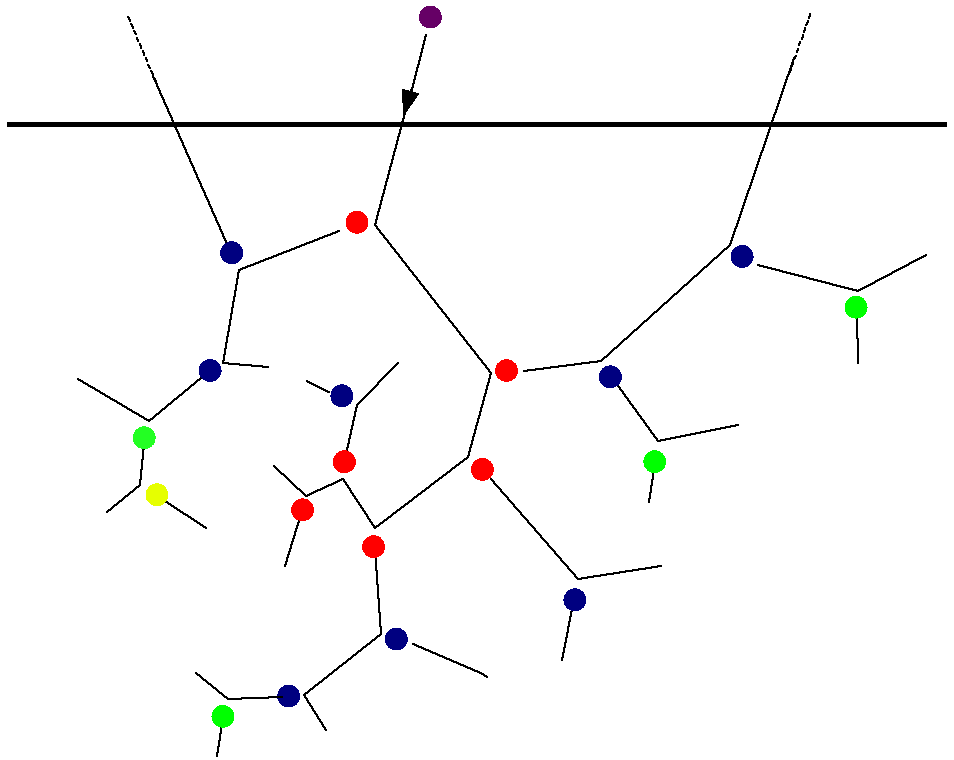
Schematic illustration of a linear collision cascade. The thick line illustrates the position of the surface, and the thinner lines the ballistic movement paths of the atoms from beginning until they stop in the material. The purple circle is the incoming ion. Red, blue, green and yellow circles illustrate primary, secondary, tertiary and quaternary recoils, respectively. In between the ballistic collisions the ions move in a straight path.

The most commonly used BCA code SRIM can be used to simulate linear collision cascades in disordered materials for all ion in all materials up to ion energies of 1 GeV. Note, however, that SRIM does not treat effects such as damage due to electronic energy deposition or damage produced by excited electrons. The nuclear and electronic stopping powers used are averaged fits to experiments, and are thus not perfectly accurate either. The electronic stopping power can be readily included in binary collision approximation or molecular dynamics (MD) simulations. In MD simulations they can be included either as a frictional force or in a more advanced manner by also following the heating of the electronic systems and coupling the electronic and atomic degrees of freedom. However, there are still uncertainties regarding the appropriate low-energy limits for electronic stopping power and electron-phonon coupling.

In linear cascades, the set of recoils produced in the sample can be described as a sequence of recoil generations depending on how many collision steps have passed since the original collision: primary knock-on atoms (PKA), secondary knock-on atoms (SKA), tertiary knock-on atoms (TKA), etc. Since it is extremely unlikely that all energy would be transferred to a knock-on atom, each generation of recoil atoms has on average less energy than the previous, and eventually the knock-on atom energies go below the threshold displacement energy for damage production, at which point no more damage can be produced.

== Heat spikes (thermal spikes) ==
When the ion is sufficiently heavy and energetic, and the material is dense, collisions between ions may happen so close together that they cannot be treated as independent events. In this case the process becomes a complicated process of many-body interactions between hundreds and tens of thousands of atoms, which can not be treated with the BCA, but can be modelled using molecular dynamics methods.

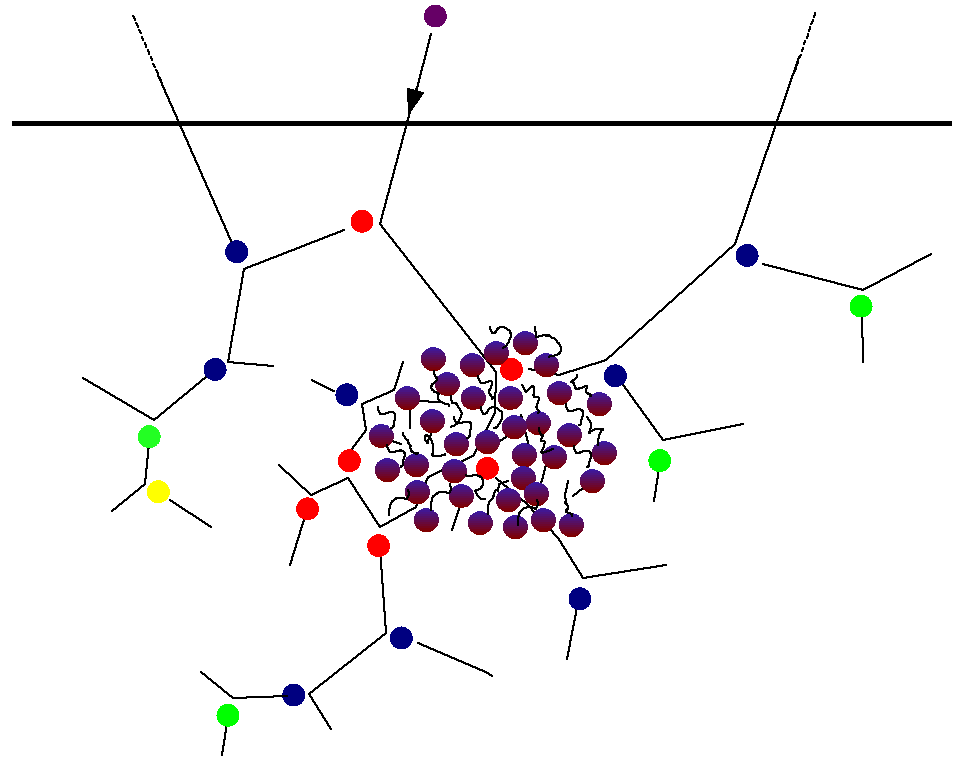
As above, but in the middle the region of collisions has become so dense that multiple collisions occur simultaneously, which is called a heat spike. In this region the ions move in complex paths, and it is not possible to distinguish the numerical order of recoils - hence the atoms are colored with a mixture of red and blue.

Typically, a heat spike is characterized by the formation of a transient underdense region in the center of the cascade, and an overdense region around it. After the cascade, the overdense region becomes interstitial defects, and the underdense region typically becomes a region of vacancies.

If the kinetic energy of the atoms in the region of dense collisions is recalculated into temperature (using the basic equation E = 3/2·N·k_{B}T), one finds that the kinetic energy in units of temperature is initially of the order of 10,000 K. Because of this, the region can be considered to be very hot, and is therefore called a heat spike or thermal spike (the two terms are usually considered to be equivalent). The heat spike cools down to the ambient temperature in 1–100 ps, so the "temperature" here does not correspond to thermodynamic equilibrium temperature. However, it has been shown that after about 3 lattice vibrations, the kinetic energy distribution of the atoms in a heat spike has the Maxwell–Boltzmann distribution, making the use of the concept of temperature somewhat justified. Moreover, experiments have shown that a heat spike can induce a phase transition which is known to require a very high temperature, showing that the concept of a (non-equilibrium) temperature is indeed useful in describing collision cascades.

In many cases, the same irradiation condition is a combination of linear cascades and heat spikes. For example, 10 MeV Cu ions bombarding Cu would initially move in the lattice in a linear cascade regime, since the nuclear stopping power is low. But once the Cu ion would slow down enough, the nuclear stopping power would increase and a heat spike would be produced. Moreover, many of the primary and secondary recoils of the incoming ions would likely have energies in the keV range and thus produce a heat spike.

For instance, for copper irradiation of copper, recoil energies of around 5–20 keV are almost guaranteed to produce heat spikes. At lower energies, the cascade energy is too low to produce a liquid-like zone. At much higher energies, the Cu ions would most likely lead initially to a linear cascade, but the recoils could lead to heat spikes, as would the initial ion once it has slowed down enough. The concept subcascade breakdown threshold energy signifies the energy above which a recoil in a material is likely to produce several isolated heat spikes rather than a single dense one.

Computer simulation-based animations of collision cascades in the heat spike regime are available on YouTube.

=== Swift heavy ion thermal spikes ===
Swift heavy ions, i.e. MeV and GeV heavy ions which produce damage by a very strong electronic stopping, can also be considered to produce thermal spikes in the sense that they lead to strong lattice heating and a transient disordered atom zone. However, at least the initial stage of the damage might be better understood in terms of a Coulomb explosion mechanism. Regardless of what the heating mechanism is, it is well established that swift heavy ions in insulators typically produce ion tracks forming long cylindrical damage zones of reduced density.

== Time scale ==
Understanding the nature of collision cascades requires knowing the associated time scale. The ballistic phase of the cascade, when the initial ion/recoil and its primary and lower-order recoils have energies well above the threshold displacement energy, typically lasts 0.1–0.5 ps. If a heat spike is formed, it can live for some 1–100 ps until the spike temperature has cooled down essentially to the ambient temperature. The cooling down of the cascade occurs via lattice heat conductivity and by electronic heat conductivity after the hot ionic subsystem has heated up the electronic one via electron–phonon coupling. Unfortunately, the rate of electron-phonon coupling in a hot and disordered ionic system is not well understood, as it differs significantly from the relatively well-known process of heat transfer from hot electrons to an undisturbed crystal structure. Finally, the relaxation phase of the cascade, when the defects formed possibly recombine and migrate, can last from a few ps to infinite times, depending on the material, its defect migration and recombination properties, and the ambient temperature.

== Effects ==
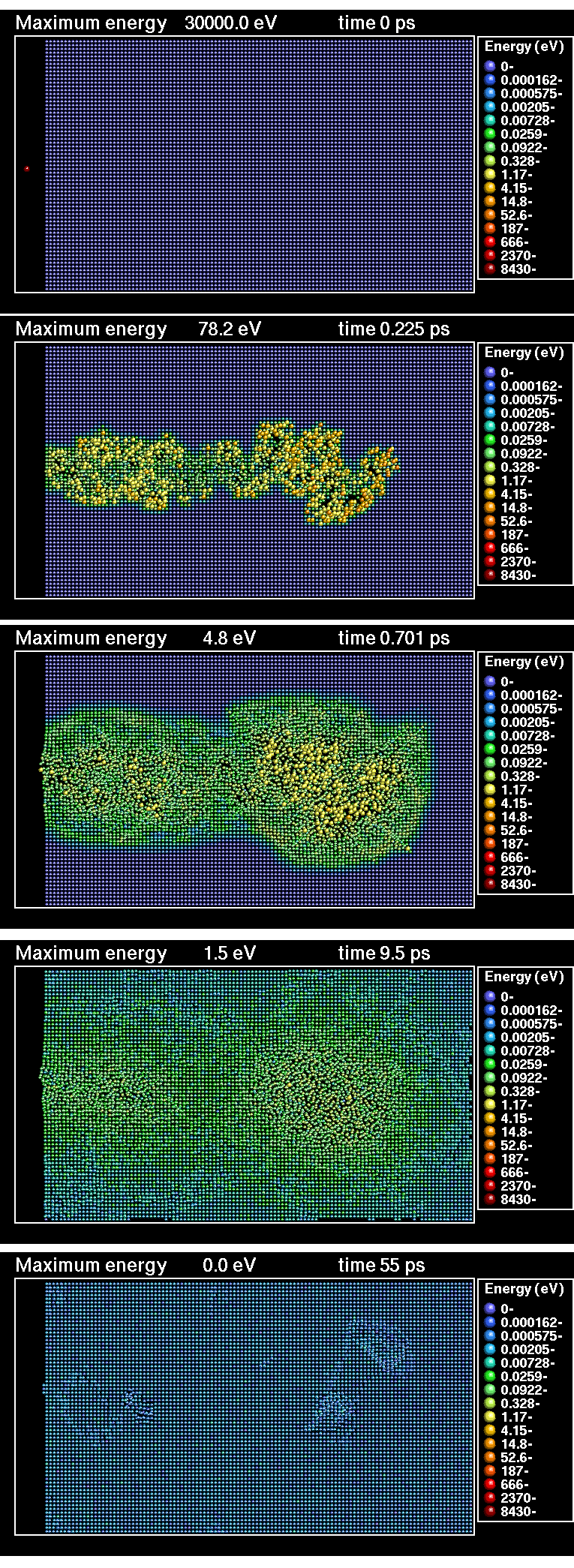
Image sequence of the time development of a collision cascade in the heat spike regime produced by a 30 keV Xe ion impacting on Au under channeling conditions. The image is produced by a classical molecular dynamics simulation of a collision cascade. The image shows a cross section of two atomic layers in the middle of a threedimensional simulation cell. Each sphere illustrates the position of an atom, and the colors show the kinetic energy of each atom as indicated by the scale on the right. At the end, both point defects and dislocation loops remain.

=== Damage production ===
Since the kinetic energies in a cascade can be very high, it can drive the material locally far outside thermodynamic equilibrium. Typically this results in defect production. The defects can be, e.g., point defects such as Frenkel pairs, ordered or disordered dislocation loops, stacking faults, or amorphous zones. Prolonged irradiation of many materials can lead to their full amorphization, an effect which occurs regularly during the ion implantation doping of silicon chips.

The defects production can be harmful, such as in nuclear fission and fusion reactors where the neutrons slowly degrade the mechanical properties of the materials, or a useful and desired materials modification effect, e.g., when ions are introduced into semiconductor quantum well structures to speed up the operation of a laser. or to strengthen carbon nanotubes.

A curious feature of collision cascades is that the final amount of damage produced may be much less than the number of atoms initially affected by the heat spikes. Especially in pure metals, the final damage production after the heat spike phase can be orders of magnitude smaller than the number of atoms displaced in the spike. On the other hand, in semiconductors and other covalently bonded materials the damage production is usually similar to the number of displaced atoms. Ionic materials can behave like either metals or semiconductors with respect to the fraction of damage recombined.

=== Other consequences ===
Collision cascades in the vicinity of a surface often lead to sputtering, both in the linear spike and heat spike regimes. Heat spikes near surfaces also frequently lead to crater formation. This cratering is caused by liquid flow of atoms, but if the projectile size above roughly 100,000 atoms, the crater production mechanism switches to the same mechanism as that of macroscopic craters produced by bullets or asteroids.

The fact that many atoms are displaced by a cascade means that ions can be used to deliberately mix materials, even for materials that are normally thermodynamically immiscible. This effect is known as ion beam mixing.

The non-equilibrium nature of irradiation can also be used to drive materials out of thermodynamic equilibrium, and thus form new kinds of alloys.

== See also ==
- Particle shower, a set of binary collisions between high-energy particles often involving nuclear reactions
- Radiation material science
- COSIRES conference
- REI conference
