= Emission channeling =

Technique in experimental physics

Emission channeling is an experimental technique for identifying the position of short-lived radioactive atoms in the lattice of a single crystal.

== The technique ==
When the radioactive atoms decay, they emit fast charged particles (e.g., α-particles and β-particles). Because of their charge, the emitted particles interact in characteristic ways with the electrons and nuclei of the crystal atoms, giving rise to channeling and blocking directions for the particle escaping the crystal. The intensity (or yield) of the emitted particles is therefore dependent on the position of the detector relative to crystal planes and axes. This fact is used to infer the location of the radioactive species in the lattice by varying the emission angles and subsequent comparison to simulation results. For the simulations, the manybeam formalism can be employed, and resolutions below 1 Å are achievable.

Among others, the technique has been used to determine the sites of manganese impurities implanted in semiconducting gallium arsenide: 70% occupy substitutional gallium sites and 28% are located at tetrahedral interstitial sites with arsenic as nearest neighbors.

== See also ==
- Channelling (physics)
