= Ion beam mixing =

Ion beam mixing is the atomic intermixing and alloying that can occur at the interface separating two different materials during ion irradiation. It is applied as a process for adhering two multilayers, especially a substrate and deposited surface layer. The process involves bombarding layered samples with doses of ion radiation in order to promote mixing at the interface, and generally serves as a means of preparing electrical junctions, especially between non-equilibrium or metastable alloys and intermetallic compounds. Ion implantation equipment can be used to achieve ion beam mixing.

== Mechanism ==
The unique effects that stem from ion beam mixing are primarily a result of ballistic effects; that is, impinging ions have high kinetic energies that are transferred to target atoms on collision. Ion energies can be seen on the order of 1 keV to 200 keV. When accelerated, such ion energies are sufficiently high to break intra- and especially inter-molecular bonds, and initiate relocations within an atomic lattice. The sequence of collisions is known as a collision cascade. During this ballistic process, energies of impinging ions displace atoms and electrons of the target material several lattice sites away, resulting in relocations there and interface mixing at the boundary layer. (Note that energies must be sufficiently high in order for the lattice rearrangements to be permanent rather than manifesting as mere vibrational responses to the impinging radiation, i.e. the kinetic energies must be above the threshold displacement energy of the material.) If energies are kept sufficiently high in these nuclear collisions, then, compared to traditional high-dose implantation processes, ballistic ion implantation produces higher intrafilm alloy concentrations at lower doses of irradiation compared to conventional implantation processes.

== Analysis ==
The degree of mixing of a film scales with the ion mass, with the intensity of any given incident ion beam, and with the duration of the impingement of the ion beam on a target. The amount of mixing is proportional to the square roots of time, mass and ion dose.

At temperatures below 100 °C for most implanted materials, ion beam mixing is essentially independent of temperature but, as temperature increases beyond that point, mixing rises exponentially with temperature. This temperature-dependence is a manifestation of incident ion beams effectively imparting the target species-dependent activation energy to the barrier layer.

Ballistic ion beam mixing can be classified into two basic subtypes, recoil mixing and cascade mixing, which take place simultaneously as a result of ion bombardment. In recoil mixing, atoms are relocated by single collision events. Recoil mixing is predominately seen at large angles as a result of soft collisions, with the number of atoms undergoing recoil implantation varying linearly with ion dose. Recoil implantation, however, is not the dominant process in ion beam mixing. Most relocated atoms are part of a collision cascade in which recoiled atoms initiate a series of lower energy lattice displacements, which is referred to as cascade mixing. Ion beam mixing can be further enhanced by heat spike effects

Ion mixing (IM) is essentially similar in result to interdiffusion, hence most models of ion mixing involve an effective diffusion coefficient that is used to characterize thickness of the reacted layer as a function of ion beam implantation over a period of time.

The diffusion model does not take into account the miscibility of substrate and layer, so for immiscible or low-miscibility systems it will overestimate the degree of mixing, while for highly miscible systems the model will underestimate the degree of mixing. Thermodynamic effects are also not considered in this basic interdiffusion equation, but can be modeled by equations that consider the enthalpies of mixing and the molar fractions of the target species, and one can thereby develop a thermodynamic effective diffusion coefficient reflecting temperature effects (which become pronounced at high temperatures).

== Advantages and disadvantages ==
Advantages of ion beam mixing as a means of synthesis over traditional modes of implantation include the process' ability to produce materials with high solute concentrations using lower amounts of irradiation, and better control of band gap variation and diffusion between layers. The cost of IM is also less prohibitive than that of other modes of film preparation on substrates, such as chemical vapor deposition (CVD) and molecular beam epitaxy (MBE).

Disadvantages include the inability to completely direct and control lattice displacements initiated in the process, which can result in an undesirable degree of disorder in ion mixed samples, rendering them unsuitable for applications in which precise lattice orderings are paramount. Ion beams cannot be perfectly directed, nor the collision cascade controlled, once IM effects propagate, which can result in leaking, electron diffraction, radiation enhanced diffusion (RED), chemical migration and mismatch. Additionally, all ion mixed samples must be annealed.

== See also ==
- List of coating techniques
