= Threshold energy =

Particle creation energy in physics

In particle physics, the threshold energy for production of a particle is the minimum kinetic energy that must be imparted to one of a pair of particles in order for their collision to produce a given result. If the desired result is to produce a third particle then the threshold energy is greater than or equal to the rest energy of the desired particle. In most cases, since momentum is also conserved, the threshold energy is significantly greater than the rest energy of the desired particle.

The threshold energy should not be confused with the threshold displacement energy, which is the minimum energy needed to permanently displace an atom in a crystal to produce a crystal defect in radiation material science.

== Example of pion creation ==
Consider the collision of a mobile proton with a stationary proton so that a ${\pi}^0$ meson is produced: $p^+ + p^+ \to p^+ + p^+ + \pi^0$

We can calculate the minimum energy that the moving proton must have in order to create a pion. Transforming into the ZMF (Zero Momentum Frame or Center of Mass Frame) and assuming the outgoing particles have no KE (kinetic energy) when viewed in the ZMF, the conservation of energy equation is:

$E = 2\gamma m_pc^2 = 2 m_pc^2+ m_\pi c^2$

Rearranged to

$\gamma = \frac{1}{\sqrt{1-\beta^2}} = \frac{2 m_pc^2+ m_\pi c^2}{2 m_pc^2}$

By assuming that the outgoing particles have no KE in the ZMF, we have effectively considered an inelastic collision in which the product particles move with a combined momentum equal to that of the incoming proton in the Lab Frame.

Our $c^2$ terms in our expression will cancel, leaving us with:

$\beta^2 = 1-\left(\frac{2 m_p}{2 m_p+ m_\pi }\right)^2 \approx 0.130$

$\beta \approx 0.360$

Using relativistic velocity additions:

$v_\text{lab} = \frac{u_\text{cm} + V_\text{cm}}{1+u_\text{cm}V_\text{cm}/c^2}$

We know that $V_{cm}$ is equal to the speed of one proton as viewed in the ZMF, so we can re-write with $u_{cm} = V_{cm}$:

$v_\text{lab} = \frac{2 u_\text{cm}}{1+u_\text{cm}^2/c^2} \approx 0.64c$

So the energy of the proton must be $E = \gamma m_p c^2 = \frac{m_p c^2}{\sqrt{1-(v_\text{lab}/c) ^2}} = 1221\,$ MeV.

Therefore, the minimum kinetic energy for the proton must be $T = E - {m_p c^2} \approx 280$ MeV.

== Example of antiproton creation ==
At higher energy, the same collision can produce an antiproton:

$$p^+ + p^+ \to p^+ + p^+ + p^+ + p^-$$

If one of the two initial protons is stationary, we find that the impinging proton must be given at least $6m_pc^2$ of energy, that is, 5.63 GeV. On the other hand, if both protons are accelerated one towards the other (in a collider) with equal energies, then each needs to be given only $m_pc^2$ of energy.

== A more general example ==
Consider the case where a particle 1 with lab energy $E_1$ (momentum $p_1$) and mass $m_1$ impinges on a target particle 2 at rest in the lab, i.e. with lab energy $E_2$ and mass $m_2$. The threshold energy $E_{1,\text{thr}}$ to produce three particles of masses $m_a$, $m_b$, $m_c$, i.e.

$1 + 2 \to a + b + c,$

is then found by assuming that these three particles are at rest in the center of mass frame (symbols with hat indicate quantities in the center of mass frame):

$E_\text{cm} = m_a c^2+ m_b c^2 + m_c c^2 = \hat{E}_1 + \hat{E}_2 = \gamma (E_1 - \beta p_1 c) + \gamma m_2 c^2$

Here $E_\text{cm}$ is the total energy available in the center of mass frame.

Using $\gamma = \frac{E_1 + m_2 c^2}{E_\text{cm}}$, $\beta = \frac{p_1 c}{E_1 + m_2 c^2}$ and $p_1^2 c^2 = E_1^2 - m_1^2 c^4$ one derives that

$E_{1,\text{thr}} = \frac{(m_a+m_b+m_c)^2-(m_1^2+m_2^2)}{2m_2}c^2$
