= Stopping and Range of Ions in Matter =

Software for simulating ionic interactions with solid matter

The Stopping and Range of Ions in Matter
- Developer: James F. Ziegler
- Release: 1983
- Stable release: SRIM-2008
- Preview release: SRIM-2013
- Written in: Visual Basic 5.0
- Operating system: Microsoft Windows
- Platform: IA-32
- Size: 34 MB (SRIM-2013 Professional)
- Available in: English
- Type: Computational physics
- License: Freeware
- Website: srim.org

Stopping and Range of Ions in Matter (SRIM) is a collection of software packages used to simulate the interaction of energetic ions with matter. The core simulation engine, Transport of Ions in Matter (TRIM), models ion implantation, energy loss, and collision cascades in solids using a Monte Carlo implementation of the binary collision approximation.

SRIM is widely used in ion implantation, radiation damage studies, and materials science to estimate ion ranges, energy deposition profiles, and defect production in solids.

== History ==
SRIM originated in 1980 as a DOS based program then called TRIM. The DOS version was upgraded until 1998 and is still available for download. It will run on a Unix PC having a DOS emulator. SRIM-2000 requires a computer with any Windows operating system. The program may work with Unix or Macintosh based systems through Wine.

The programs were developed by James F. Ziegler and Jochen P. Biersack around 1983 and are being continuously upgraded with the major changes occurring approximately every five years. SRIM is based on a Monte Carlo simulation method, namely the binary collision approximation with a random selection of the impact parameter of the next colliding ion.

== Operation ==
As the input parameters, it needs the ion type and energy (in the range 10 eV – 2 GeV) and the material of one or several target layers. Users may also define the number of ions to simulate and select between different calculation modes (e.g., full cascade simulations or quick stopping range estimates). The simulation may be performed in different modes, including full cascade calculations using TRIM or simplified calculations that estimate ion range and stopping without tracking detailed collision events.

A typical simulation involves defining an ion species and incident energy, selecting a target material such as silicon or a compound, and computing quantities such as penetration depth, straggle, and damage profiles as a function of depth. Such calculations are commonly used to estimate implantation ranges and compare with experimental measurements.

== TRIM and Monte-Carlo Simulation ==
The core of SRIM is the Transport of Ions in Matter (TRIM) program, which performs detailed simulations of ion transport in solids. TRIM uses a Monte Carlo method to model the trajectories of individual ions as they undergo successive collisions within the target material. In this approach, each ion is followed through a sequence of collisions determined probabilistically, with impact parameters and scattering angles sampled from appropriate distributions. Between collisions, ions are assumed to travel in straight line paths while continuously losing energy due to electronic stopping.

When sufficient energy is transferred during a collision, target atoms may be displaced from their original positions, becoming recoils that can produce additional collisions. This results in a collision cascade, which TRIM tracks until all particles fall below a specified energy threshold. Because the simulation is statistical in nature, many ions must be simulated to show smooth distributions of range, damage, and energy deposition. The accuracy of the results depends on the number of ion histories calculated. The Monte Carlo approach allows SRIM to efficiently sample a wide range of possible ion trajectories and collision outcomes, producing statistically averaged results rather than deterministic single-particle solutions.

== Outputs ==
As the output, SRIM lists or plots the three-dimensional distribution of the ions in the solid and its parameters, such as penetration depth, its spread along the ion beam (called straggle) and perpendicular to it, all target atom cascades in the target are followed in detail; concentration of vacancies, sputtering rate, ionization, and phonon production in the target material; energy partitioning between the nuclear and electron losses, energy deposition rate; and depth-dependent profiles of damage and implanted ion concentration. Output data are typically accumulated over many simulated ion histories and presented as statistical distributions, reflecting the probabilistic nature of the Monte Carlo method. These results are often visualized as depth distribution histograms or profiles showing ion concentration and damage as a function of penetration depth.

== Software Features ==
The programs are made so they can be interrupted at any time and then resumed later. They have an easy-to-use user interface and built-in default parameters for all ions and materials. Another part of the software allows calculating the electronic stopping power of any ion in any material (including gaseous targets) based on an averaging parametrization of a vast range of experimental data. These stopping power tables are frequently used independently of full TRIM simulations for quick estimates of ion range and energy loss.

These features contributed to its widespread use in ion implantation and radiation damage studies. SRIM also allows users to visualize ion trajectories and collision events, providing graphical representations of ion tracks and damage cascades within the target material. The graphical interface provides access to multiple calculation modules, including TRIM simulations, stopping power tables, and material definition tools.

== Stopping power calculations ==
In addition to full Monte Carlo simulations, SRIM includes a module for calculating stopping power and range tables for ions in matter. These tables are generated using semi-empirical models fitted to experimental data and are often used independently of TRIM simulations.

The stopping power module allows rapid estimation of ion energy loss and penetration depth across a wide range of ion-target combinations and is frequently used for preliminary calculations and benchmarking. Because these calculations do not require full cascade simulation, they are computationally efficient and commonly used for quick parameter studies.

== Modeling Assumptions ==
However, SRIM doesn't take account of the crystal structure nor dynamic composition changes in the material that severely limits its usefulness in some cases.

Other approximations of the program include binary collision (i.e. the influence of neighboring atoms is neglected); the material is fully amorphous, i.e. description of ion channeling effects is not possible, recombination of knocked off atoms (interstitials) with the vacancies, an effect known to be very important in heat spikes in metals, is neglected; ion trajectories are therefore modeled as a sequence of independent two-body interactions using a Monte Carlo sampling of collision parameters. These assumptions allow for efficient computation but limit the ability of the model to capture correlated atomic motion and collective effects during dense collision cascades. As a result, the model is most applicable to amorphous or polycrystalline materials where long-range order is less significant.

== Damage and Defect Limitations ==
There is no description of defect clustering and irradiation-induced amorphization, even though the former occurs in most materials and the latter is very important in semiconductors. As a result, SRIM primarily provides an estimate of initial damage production rather than long-term defect evolution. Consequently, SRIM results are often interpreted as representing the initial state of radiation damage immediately following ion impact, prior to any thermally activated processes. More advanced simulation methods are typically required to model subsequent defect evolution and material response over longer timescales.

== Stopping Power and Potentials ==
The electronic stopping power is an averaging fit to a large number of experiments. and the interatomic potential as a universal form which is an averaging fit to quantum mechanical calculations, the target atom which reaches the surface can leave the surface (be sputtered) if it has momentum and energy to pass the surface barrier, which is a simplifying assumption that does not work well e.g. at energies below the surface penetration energy or if chemical effects are present. Surface binding is therefore treated using simplified threshold criteria rather than detailed surface physics models. The use of averaged stopping power models allows SRIM to cover a wide range of ion-target combinations but may introduce uncertainties when applied outside experimentally validated regimes. Comparisons with experimental data have shown that these models provide reasonable agreement in many energy ranges, particularly for medium-energy ions in amorphous materials.

== Geometry Limitations ==
The system is layered, i.e. simulation of materials with composition differences in 2D or 3D is not possible. This restricts simulations to one-dimensional depth variations in material composition. As a result, lateral inhomogeneities or complex three-dimensional structures cannot be directly represented within the simulation framework. This limitation is important when modeling patterned materials or devices with non-uniform geometries.

== Displacement Energy Model ==
The threshold displacement energy is a step function for each element, even though in reality it is crystal-direction dependent. In practice, users often adjust these values to better match experimental conditions. This simplification can affect the accuracy of predicted damage distributions, particularly in anisotropic crystalline materials. Variations in displacement energy with crystallographic direction are therefore not captured explicitly within the model.

== See also ==
- Binary collision approximation
- Stopping power (particle radiation)
- Attenuation length
- Collision cascade
- Sputtering
- Ion implantation
