= Binary collision approximation =

Heuristic used in simulations of ions passing through solids

In condensed-matter physics, the binary collision approximation (BCA) is a heuristic used to more efficiently simulate the penetration depth and defect production by energetic ions (with kinetic energies in the kilo-electronvolt (keV) range or higher) in solids. In the method, the ion is approximated to travel through a material by experiencing a sequence of independent binary collisions with sample atoms (nuclei). Between the collisions, the ion is assumed to travel in a straight path, experiencing electronic stopping power, but losing no energy in collisions with nuclei.

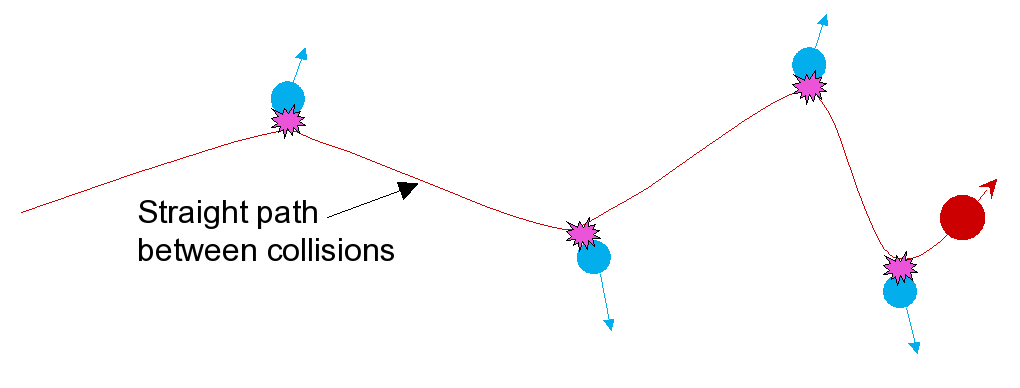
Schematic illustration of independent binary collisions between atoms

== Simulation approaches ==
In the BCA approach, a single collision between the incoming ion and a target atom (nucleus) is treated by solving the classical scattering integral between two colliding particles for the impact parameter of the incoming ion. Solution of the integral gives the scattering angle of the ion as well as its energy loss to the sample atoms, and hence what the energy is after the collision compared to before it. The scattering integral is defined in the centre-of-mass coordinate system (two particles reduced to one single particle with one interatomic potential) and relates the angle of scatter with the interatomic potential.

The scattering angle is determined from the repulsive pair interatomic potential $V(r)$ as a function of the impact parameter $b$ a

$\Theta = \pi - \int_{-\infty}^{\infty} \frac{b dr}{r^2\sqrt{1-\frac{b^2}{r^2} - \frac{V(r)}{E_{CM}} }}$

where $E_{CM}$is the system energy in center-of-mass coordinates. From this the energy transfer can be obtained using

$T = 4 \frac{M_1 M_2} {(M_1+M_2)^2}E\cos^2 \theta_2$ where $\theta_2 = \frac{\pi-\Theta}{2}$

where $E$ is the energy of the incoming ion of mass $M_1$and $M_2$ is the mass of the material atom with which the collision is happening.

It is also possible to solve the time integral of the collision to know what time has elapsed during the collision. This is necessary at least when BCA is used in the "full cascade" mode, see below.

The energy loss to electrons, i.e. electronic stopping power, can be treated either with impact-parameter dependent electronic stopping models, by subtracting a stopping power dependent on the ion velocity only between the collisions, or a combination of the two approaches.

The selection method for the impact parameter divided BCA codes into two main varieties: "Monte Carlo" BCA and crystal-BCA codes.

In the so-called Monte Carlo BCA approach the distance to and impact parameter of the next colliding atom is chosen randomly from a probability distribution which depends only on the atomic density of the material. This approach essentially simulates ion passage in a fully amorphous material. (Note that some sources call this variety of BCA just Monte Carlo, which is misleading since the name can then be confused with other completely different Monte Carlo simulation varieties). SRIM and SDTrimSP are Monte-Carlo BCA codes.

It is also possible (although more difficult) to implement BCA methods for crystalline materials, such that the moving ion has a defined position in a crystal, and the distance and impact parameter to the next colliding atom is determined to correspond to an atom in the crystal. In this approach BCA can be used to simulate also atom motion during channelling. Codes such as MARLOWE operate with this approach.

The binary collision approximation can also be extended to simulate dynamic composition changes of a material due to prolonged ion irradiation, i.e. due to ion implantation and sputtering.

At low ion energies, the approximation of independent collisions between atoms starts to break down. This issue can be to some extent augmented by solving the collision integral for multiple simultaneous collisions. However, at very low energies (below ~1 keV, for a more accurate estimate see) the BCA approximation always breaks down, and one should use molecular dynamics ion irradiation simulation approaches because these can, per design, handle many-body collisions of arbitrarily many atoms. The MD simulations can either follow only the incoming ion (recoil interaction approximation or RIA) or simulate all atoms involved in a collision cascade .

== BCA collision cascade simulations ==
The BCA simulations can be further subdivided by type depending on whether they only follow the incoming ion, or also follow the recoils produced by the ion (full cascade mode, e.g., in the popular BCA code SRIM). If the code does not account for secondary collisions (recoils), the number of defects is then calculated using the Robinson extension of the Kinchin-Pease model.

If the initial recoil/ion mass is low, and the material where the cascade occurs has a low density (i.e. the recoil-material combination has a low stopping power), the collisions between the initial recoil and sample atoms occur rarely, and can be understood well as a sequence of independent binary collisions between atoms. This kind of a cascade can be theoretically well treated using BCA.

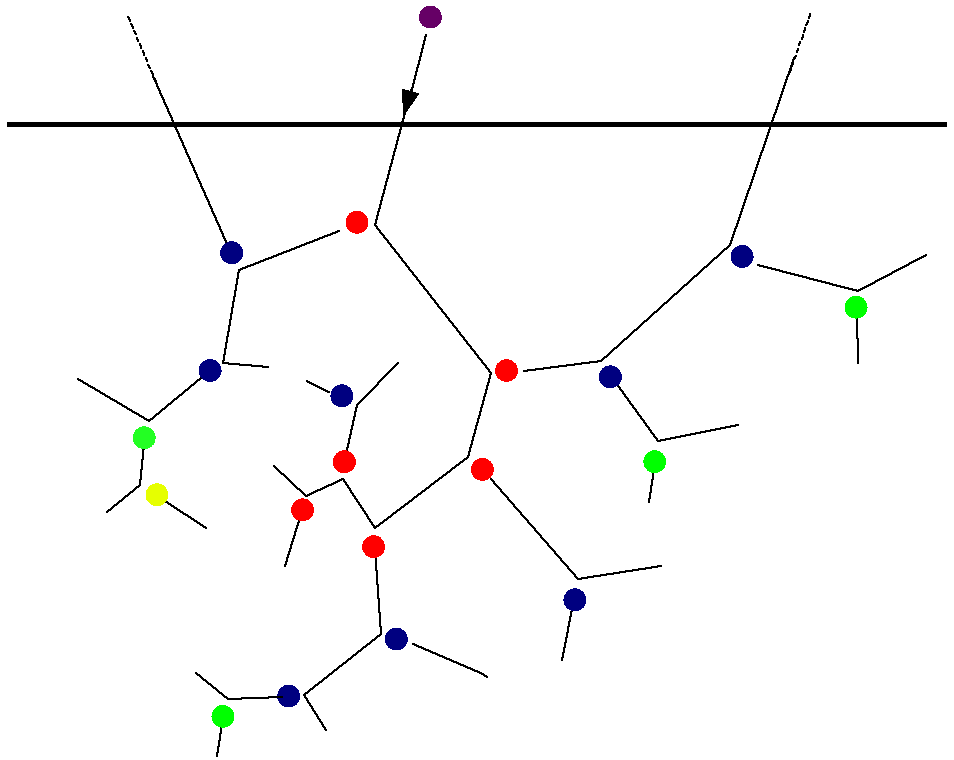
Schematic illustration of a linear collision cascade. The thick line illustrates the position of the surface, and the thinner lines the ballistic movement paths of the atoms from beginning until they stop in the material. The purple circle is the incoming ion. Red, blue, green and yellow circles illustrate primary, secondary, tertiary and quaternary recoils, respectively. In between the ballistic collisions the ions move in a straight path. BCA can in "full cascade mode" describe well linear collision cascades.

== Damage production estimates ==
The BCA simulations give naturally the ion penetration depth, lateral spread and nuclear and electronic deposition energy distributions in space. They can also be used to estimate the damage produced in materials, by using the assumption that any recoil which receives an energy higher than the threshold displacement energy of the material will produce a stable defect.

However, this approach should be used with great caution for several reasons. For instance, it does not account for any thermally activated recombination of damage, nor the well known fact that in metals the damage production is for high energies only something like 20% of the Kinchin-Pease prediction. Moreover, this approach only predicts the damage production as if all defects were isolated Frenkel pairs, while in reality in many cases collision cascades produce defect clusters or even dislocations as the initial damage state. BCA codes can, however, be extended with damage clustering and recombination models that improve on their reliability in this respect. Finally, the average threshold displacement energy is not very accurately known in most materials.

== BCA codes ==
- SRIM offers a graphical user interface and is likely the most used BCA code now. It can be used to simulate linear collision cascades in amorphous materials for all ion in all materials up to ion energies of 1 GeV. Note, however, that SRIM does not treat effects such as channelling, damage due to electronic energy deposition (necessary, e.g., to describe swift heavy ion damage in materials) or damage produced by excited electrons. The calculated sputter yields may be less accurate than that from other codes.
- MARLOWE is a large code that can handle crystalline materials and support numerous different physics models.
- TRIDYN, newer versions known as SDTrimSP, is a BCA code capably of handling dynamic composition changes.
- DART, French code developed by the CEA (Commisariat à l'Energie Atomique) in Saclay. Differs from SRIM in its electronic stopping power and analytical resolution of the scattering integral (the amount of defects produced is determined from the elastic cross sections and the atomic concentrations of atoms). The nuclear stopping power comes from the universal interatomic potential (ZBL potential) while the electronic stopping power is derived from Bethe's equation for protons and Lindhard-Scharff for ions.

== See also ==
- Collision cascade
- Molecular dynamics
- Stopping power (particle radiation)
