= Wigner effect =

Dislocation of atoms in a solid caused by neutron radiation

The Wigner effect (named for its discoverer, Eugene Wigner), also known as the discomposition effect or Wigner's disease, is the displacement of atoms in a solid caused by neutron radiation.

Any solid can display the Wigner effect. The effect is of most concern in neutron moderators, such as graphite, intended to reduce the speed of fast neutrons, thereby turning them into thermal neutrons capable of sustaining a nuclear chain reaction involving uranium-235.

== Cause ==
To cause the Wigner effect, neutrons that collide with the atoms in a crystal structure must have enough energy to displace them from the lattice. This amount (threshold displacement energy) is approximately 25 eV. A neutron's energy can vary widely, from thermal neutron (0.025 eV), to fast neutron (> 1 MeV) in the centre of a nuclear reactor. A neutron with a significant amount of energy will create a displacement cascade in a matrix via elastic collisions.

For example, a 1 MeV neutron striking graphite will create 900 displacements. Not all displacements will create defects, because some of the struck atoms will find and fill the vacancies that were either small pre-existing voids or vacancies newly formed by the other struck atoms.

== Frenkel defect ==
The atoms that do not find a vacancy come to rest in non-ideal locations; that is, not along the symmetrical lines of the lattice. These interstitial atoms (or simply "interstitials") and their associated vacancies are a Frenkel defect. Because these atoms are not in the ideal location, they have a Wigner energy associated with them, much as a ball at the top of a hill has gravitational potential energy.

When a large number of interstitials have accumulated, they risk releasing all of their energy suddenly, creating a rapid, great increase in temperature. Sudden, unplanned increases in temperature can present a large risk for certain types of nuclear reactors with low operating temperatures. One such release was the indirect cause of the Windscale fire. Accumulation of energy in irradiated graphite has been recorded as high as 2.7 kJ/g--enough to raise the temperature by thousands of degrees—but is typically much lower than this.

== Windscale and Chernobyl ==
Despite some reports, Wigner energy buildup had nothing to do with the cause of the Chernobyl disaster: this reactor, like all contemporary power reactors, operated at a high enough temperature to allow the displaced graphite structure to realign itself before any potential energy could be stored. Wigner energy may have played some part following the prompt critical neutron spike, when the accident entered the graphite fire phase of events.

However, Wigner energy was the cause of the Windscale fire on 10 October 1957 at the Sellafield nuclear site in UK.

== Dissipation of Wigner energy ==
A buildup of Wigner energy can be relieved by heating the material. This process is known as annealing. In graphite this occurs at 250 °C (482 °F).

== Intimate Frenkel pairs ==
In 2003, it was postulated that Wigner energy can be stored by the formation of metastable defect structures in graphite. Notably, the large energy release observed at 200–250 °C has been described in terms of a metastable interstitial-vacancy pair. The interstitial atom becomes trapped on the lip of the vacancy, and there is a barrier for it to recombine to give perfect graphite.

== General references ==
- Glasstone, Samuel, and Alexander Sesonske [1963] (1994). Nuclear Reactor Engineering. Boston: Springer. ISBN 0-412-98531-4. OCLC 852791143.
