= PKA (irradiation) =

Atom displaced from its lattice site by an incident particle

In condensed-matter physics, a primary knock-on atom (PKA) is an atom that is displaced from its lattice site by irradiation; it is, by definition, the first atom that an incident particle encounters in the target. After it is displaced from its initial lattice site, the PKA can induce the subsequent lattice site displacements of other atoms if it possesses sufficient energy (threshold displacement energy), or come to rest in the lattice at an interstitial site if it does not (interstitial defect).

Most of the displaced atoms resulting from electron irradiation and some other types of irradiation are PKAs, since these are usually below the threshold displacement energy and therefore do not have sufficient energy to displace more atoms. In other cases like fast neutron irradiation, most of the displacements result from higher-energy PKAs colliding with other atoms as they slow down to rest.

== Collision Models ==
Atoms can only be displaced if, upon bombardment, the energy they receive exceeds a threshold energy E_{d}. Likewise, when a moving atom collides with a stationary atom, both atoms will have energy greater than E_{d} after the collision only if the original moving atom had an energy exceeding 2E_{d}. Thus, only PKAs with an energy greater than 2E_{d} can continue to displace more atoms and increase the total number of displaced atoms. In cases where the PKA does have sufficient energy to displace further atoms, the same truth holds for any subsequently displaced atom.

In any scenario, the majority of displaced atoms leave their lattice sites with energies no more than two or three times E_{d}. Such an atom will collide with another atom approximately every mean interatomic distance traveled, losing half of its energy during the average collision. Assuming that an atom that has slowed down to a kinetic energy of 1 eV becomes trapped in an interstitial site, displaced atoms will typically be trapped no more than a few interatomic distances away from the vacancies they leave behind.

There are several possible scenarios for the energy of PKAs, and these lead to different forms of damage. In the case of electron or gamma ray bombardment, the PKA usually does not have sufficient energy to displace more atoms. The resulting damage consists of a random distribution of Frenkel defects, usually with a distance no more than four or five interatomic distances between the interstitial and vacancy. When PKAs receive energy greater than E_{d} from bombarding electrons, they are able to displace more atoms, and some of the Frenkel defects become groups of interstitial atoms with corresponding vacancies, within a few interatomic distances of each other. In the case of bombardment by fast-moving atoms or ions, groups of vacancies and interstitial atoms widely separated along the track of the atom or ion are produced. As the atom slows down, the cross section for producing PKAs increases, resulting in groups of vacancies and interstitials concentrated at the end of the track.

== Damage Models ==
A thermal spike is a region in which a moving particle heats up the material surrounding its track through the solid for times of the order of 10^{−12} s. In its path, a PKA can produce effects similar to those of heating and rapidly quenching a metal, resulting in Frenkel defects. A thermal spike does not last long enough to permit annealing of the Frenkel defects.

A different model called the displacement spike was proposed for fast neutron bombardment of heavy elements. With high energy PKAs, the region affected is heated to temperatures above the material's melting point, and instead of considering individual collisions, the entire volume affected could be considered to “melt” for a short period of time. The words “melt” and “liquid” are used loosely here because it is not clear whether the material at such high temperatures and pressures would be a liquid or a dense gas. Upon melting, former interstitials and vacancies become “density fluctuations,” since the surrounding lattice points no longer exist in liquid. In the case of a thermal spike, the temperature is not high enough to maintain the liquid state long enough for density fluctuations to relax and interatomic exchange to occur. A rapid “quenching” effect results in vacancy-interstitial pairs that persist throughout melting and resolidification. Towards the end of the path of a PKA, the rate of energy loss becomes high enough to heat up the material well above its melting point. While the material is melted, atomic interchange occurs as a result of random motion of the atoms initiated by the relaxation of local strains from the density fluctuations. This releases stored energy from these strains that raises the temperature even higher, maintaining the liquid state briefly after most of the density fluctuations disappear. During this time, the turbulent motions continue so that upon resolidification, most of the atoms will occupy new lattice sites. Such regions are called displacement spikes, which, unlike thermal spikes, do not retain Frenkel defects.

Based on these theories, there should be two different regions, each retaining a different form of damage, along the path of a PKA. A thermal spike should occur in the earlier part of the path, and this high-energy region retains vacancy-interstitial pairs. There should be a displacement spike towards the end of the path, a low-energy region where atoms have been moved to new lattice sites but no vacancy-interstitial pairs are retained.

== Cascade Damage ==
The structure of cascade damage is strongly dependent on PKA energy, so the PKA energy spectrum should be used as the basis of evaluating microstructural changes under cascade damage. In thin gold foil, at lower bombardment doses, the interactions of cascades are insignificant, and both visible vacancy clusters and invisible vacancy-rich regions are formed by cascade collision sequences. The interaction of cascades at higher doses was found to produce new clusters near existing groups of vacancy clusters, apparently converting invisible vacancy-rich regions to visible vacancy clusters. These processes are dependent on PKA energy, and from three PKA spectra obtained from fission neutrons, 21 MeV self-ions, and fusion neutrons, the minimum PKA energy required to produce new visible clusters by interaction was estimated to be 165 keV.

== See also ==
- Vacancy defect
- Interstitial defect
