= Stopping power (particle radiation) =

Retarding force acting on charged particles due to interactions with matter

In nuclear and materials physics, stopping power is the retarding force acting on charged particles, typically alpha and beta particles, due to interaction with matter, resulting in loss of particle kinetic energy.

Stopping power is also interpreted as the rate at which a material absorbs the kinetic energy of a charged particle. Its application is important in a wide range of thermodynamic areas such as radiation protection, ion implantation and nuclear medicine.

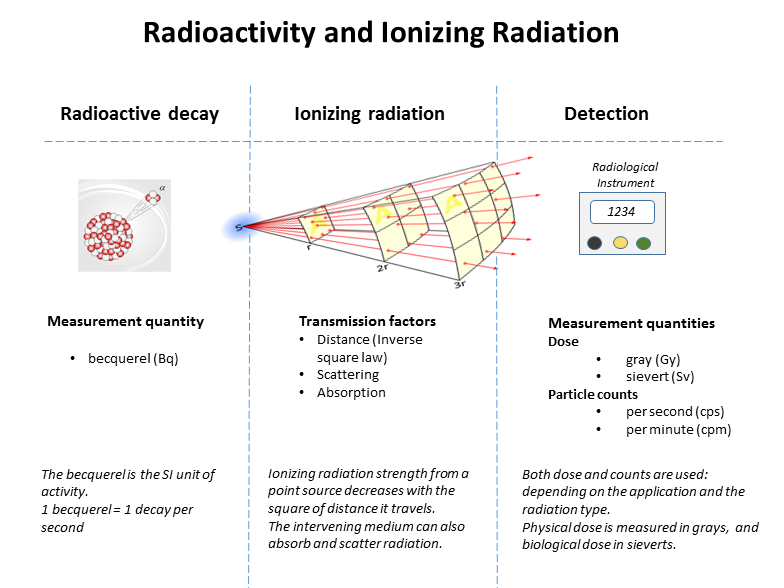
Graphic showing relationships between radioactivity and detected ionizing radiation

== Definition and Bragg curve ==
Both charged and uncharged particles lose energy while passing through matter. Positive ions are considered in most cases below.

The stopping power depends on the type and energy of the radiation and on the properties of the material it passes. Since the production of an ion pair (usually a positive ion and a (negative) electron) requires a fixed amount of energy (for example, 33.97 eV in dry air), the number of ionizations per path length is proportional to the stopping power. The stopping power of the material is numerically equal to the loss of energy E per unit path length, x:

$$S(E) = -dE/dx$$

The minus sign makes S positive.

Bragg curve of 5.49 MeV alpha particles in air

The force usually increases toward the end of range and reaches a maximum, the Bragg peak, shortly before the energy drops to zero. The curve that describes the force as function of the material depth is called the Bragg curve. This is of great practical importance for radiation therapy.

The equation above defines the linear stopping power which in the international system is expressed in N but is usually indicated in other units like MeV/mm or similar. If a substance is compared in gaseous and solid form, then the linear stopping powers of the two states are very different just because of the different density. One therefore often divides the force by the density of the material to obtain the mass stopping power which in the international system is expressed in m^{4}/s^{2} but is usually found in units like MeV/(mg/cm^{2}) or similar. The mass stopping power then depends only very little on the density of the material.

The picture shows how the stopping power of 5.49 MeV alpha particles increases while the particle traverses air, until it reaches the maximum. This particular energy corresponds to that of the alpha particle radiation from naturally radioactive gas radon (^{222}Rn) which is present in the air in minute amounts.

The mean range can be calculated by integrating the reciprocal stopping power over energy:

$$\Delta x=\int_{0}^{E_0}\frac{1}{S(E)}\, dE$$

where:

E_{0} is the initial kinetic energy of the particle
Δx is the "continuous slowing down approximation (CSDA)" range and
S(E) is the linear stopping power.

The deposited energy can be obtained by integrating the stopping power over the entire path length of the ion while it moves in the material.

== Electronic, nuclear and radiative stopping ==
Electronic stopping refers to the slowing down of a projectile ion due to the inelastic collisions between bound electrons in the medium and the ion moving through it. The term inelastic is used to signify that energy is lost during the process (the collisions may result both in excitations of bound electrons of the medium, and in excitations of the electron cloud of the ion as well). Linear electronic stopping power is identical to unrestricted linear energy transfer.

Instead of energy transfer, some models consider the electronic stopping power as momentum transfer between electron gas and energetic ion. This is consistent with the result of Hans Bethe, the Bethe formula, in the high energy range.

Since the number of collisions an ion experiences with electrons is large, and since the charge state of the ion while traversing the medium may change frequently, it is very difficult to describe all possible interactions for all possible ion charge states. Instead, the electronic stopping power is often given as a simple function of energy $F_e (E)$ which is an average taken over all energy loss processes for different charge states. It can be theoretically determined to an accuracy of a few % in the energy range above several hundred keV per nucleon from theoretical treatments, the best known being the aforementioned Bethe formula. At energies lower than about 100 keV per nucleon, it becomes more difficult to determine the electronic stopping using analytical models. Recently real-time Time-dependent density functional theory has been successfully used to accurately determine the electronic stopping for various ion-target systems over a wide range of energies including the low energy regime.

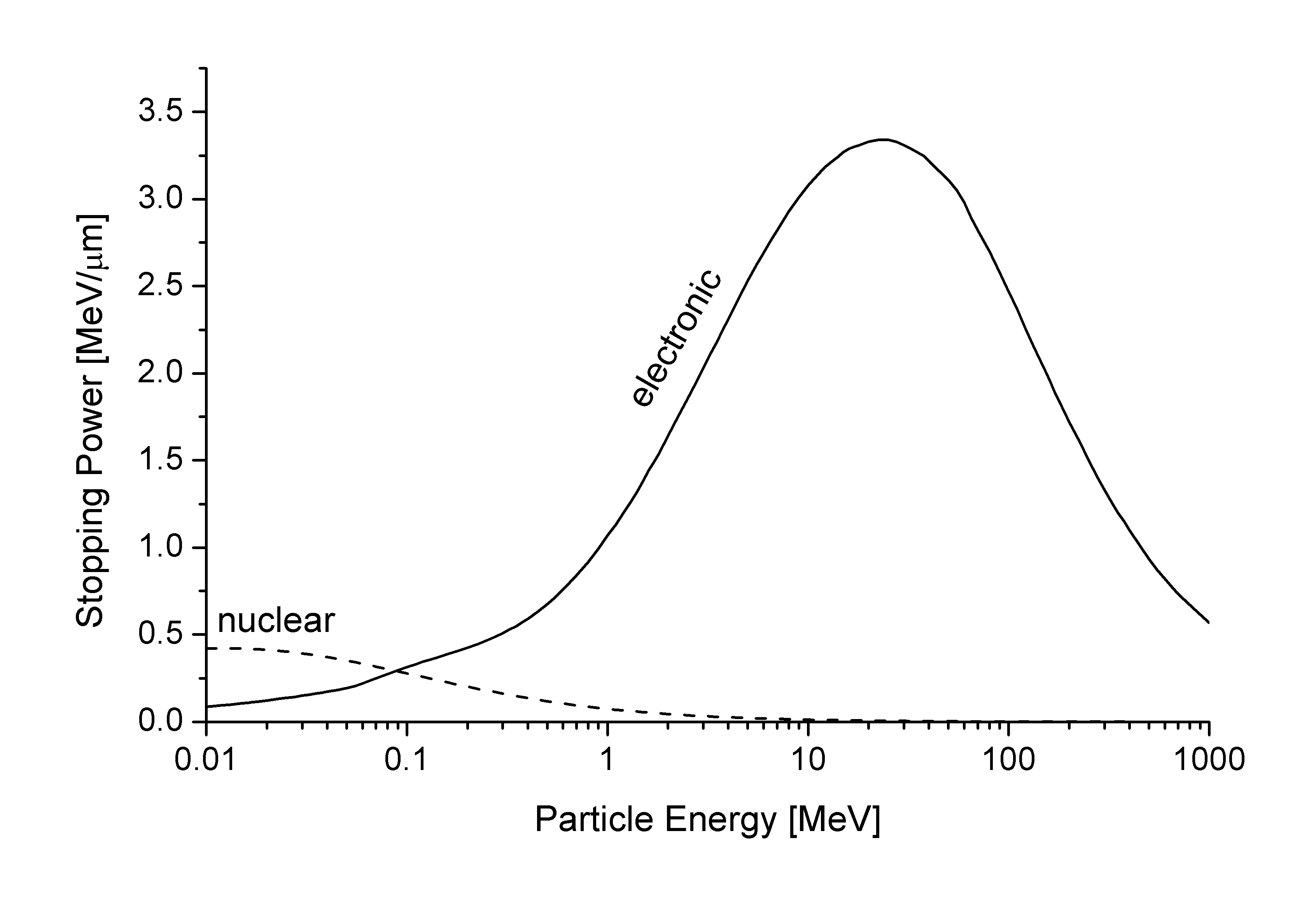
Electronic and nuclear stopping power for aluminum ions in aluminum, versus particle energy per nucleon. The maximum of the nuclear stopping curve typically occurs at energies of the order of 1 keV per nucleon.

Graphical presentations of experimental values of the electronic stopping power for many ions in many substances have been given by Paul. The accuracy of various stopping tables has been determined using statistical comparisons.

Nuclear stopping power refers to the elastic collisions between the projectile ion and atoms in the sample (the established designation "nuclear" may be confusing since nuclear stopping is not due to nuclear forces, but it is meant to note that this type of stopping involves the interaction of the ion with the nuclei in the target). If one knows the form of the repulsive potential energy $V (r)$ between two atoms (see below), it is possible to calculate the nuclear stopping power $F_n (E)$. This is done by determining the energy loss in binary collisions $T(E,b)$ of two atoms interacting with the energy $V (r)$ as a function of impact parameter $b$

$$F_n (E) =  2 \pi \int_0^\infty T(E_0,b) b db$$

In the stopping power figure shown above for aluminium ions in aluminum, nuclear stopping is negligible except at the lowest energy. Nuclear stopping increases when the mass of the ion increases. In the figure shown on the right, nuclear stopping is larger than electronic stopping at low energy. For very light ions slowing down in heavy materials, the nuclear stopping is weaker than the electronic at all energies.

Especially in the field of radiation damage in detectors, the term "non-ionizing energy loss" (NIEL) is used as a term opposite to the linear energy transfer (LET), see e.g. Refs. Since per definition nuclear stopping power does not involve electronic excitations, NIEL and nuclear stopping can be considered to be the same quantity in the absence of nuclear reactions.

The total non-relativistic stopping power is therefore the sum of two terms: $F(E) = F_e (E) + F_n (E)$. Several semi-empirical stopping power formulas have been devised. The model given by Ziegler, Biersack and Littmark (the so-called "ZBL" stopping, see next chapter), implemented in different versions of the TRIM/SRIM codes, is used most often today.

Radiative stopping power, which is due to the emission of bremsstrahlung in the electric fields of the particles in the material traversed, must be considered at extremely high ion energies. For electron projectiles, radiative stopping is always important. At high ion energies, there may also be energy losses due to nuclear reactions, but such processes are not normally described by stopping power.

Close to the surface of a solid target material, both nuclear and electronic stopping may lead to sputtering.

== The slowing-down process in solids ==
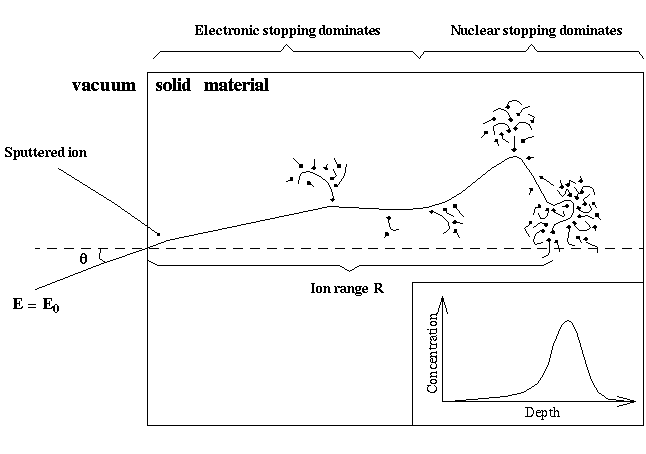
Illustration of the slowing down of a single ion in a solid material

In the beginning of the slowing-down process at high energies, the ion is slowed mainly by electronic stopping, and it moves almost in a straight path. When the ion has slowed sufficiently, the collisions with nuclei (the nuclear stopping) become more and more probable, finally dominating the slowing down. When atoms of the solid receive significant recoil energies when struck by the ion, they will be removed from their lattice positions, and produce a cascade of further collisions in the material. These collision cascades are the main cause of damage production during ion implantation in metals and semiconductors.

When the energies of all atoms in the system have fallen below the threshold displacement energy, the production of new damage ceases, and the concept of nuclear stopping is no longer meaningful. The total amount of energy deposited by the nuclear collisions to atoms in the materials is called the nuclear deposited energy.

The inset in the figure shows a typical range distribution of ions deposited in the solid. The case shown here might, for instance, be the slowing down of a 1 MeV silicon ion in silicon. The mean range for a 1 MeV ion is typically in the micrometer range.

=== Repulsive interatomic potentials ===
At very small distances between the nuclei the repulsive interaction can be regarded as essentially Coulombic. At greater distances, the electron clouds screen the nuclei from each other. Thus the repulsive potential can be described by multiplying the Coulombic repulsion between nuclei with a screening function φ(r/a),

$$V(r) = { 1 \over 4 \pi \varepsilon_0} {Z_1Z_2 e^2 \over r} \varphi(r/a)$$

where φ(r/a) → 1 when r → 0. Here $Z_1$ and $Z_2$ are the charges of the interacting nuclei, and r the distance between them; a is the so-called screening parameter.

A large number of different repulsive potentials and screening functions have been proposed over the years, some determined semi-empirically, others from theoretical calculations. A much used repulsive potential is the one given by Ziegler, Biersack and Littmark, the so-called ZBL repulsive potential. It has been constructed by fitting a universal screening function to theoretically obtained potentials calculated for a large variety of atom pairs. The ZBL screening parameter and function have the forms

$$a = a_u = { 0.8854a_0 \over Z_1^{0.23} + Z_2^{0.23} }$$

and

$$\varphi(x) = 0.1818e^{-3.2x} +0.5099e^{-0.9423x} +0.2802e^{-0.4029x}  +0.02817e^{-0.2016x}$$

where x = r/a_{u}, and a_{0} is the Bohr atomic radius = 0.529 Å. The standard deviation of the fit of the universal ZBL repulsive potential to the theoretically calculated pair-specific potentials it is fit to is 18% above 2 eV.

Even more accurate repulsive potentials can be obtained from self-consistent total energy calculations using density-functional theory or other quantum chemical methods such as Hartree-Fock methods. Nordlund, Lehtola and Hobler have compared potentials with these methods for all atom pairs from Z=1 (hydrogen) to Z=92 (uranium) and shown that pair-specific quantum chemical calculations can give repulsive potentials that are accurate to within ~1% above 30 eV. Moreover, they fit pair-specific "NLH" screening parameters for all atom pairs in the range Z_{1}, Z_{2} <= 92 in the functional form

$\varphi(r) = a_1^{-b_1 r} + a_2^{-b_2 r} + a_3^{-b_3 r}$

where r is directly the interatomic distance, i.e. the screening parameter a=1. The pair-specific parameters are available in the supplemental material of Ref.: .

=== Channeling ===
In crystalline materials the ion may in some instances get "channeled", i.e., get focused into a channel between crystal planes where it experiences almost no collisions with nuclei. Also, the electronic stopping power may be weaker in the channel. Thus the nuclear and electronic stopping do not only depend on material type and density but also on its microscopic structure and cross-section.

=== Computer simulations of ion slowing down ===
Computer simulation methods to calculate the motion of ions in a medium have been developed since the 1960s, and are now the dominant way of treating stopping power theoretically. The basic idea in them is to follow the movement of the ion in the medium by simulating the collisions with nuclei in the medium. The electronic stopping power is usually taken into account as a frictional force slowing down the ion.

Conventional methods used to calculate ion ranges are based on the binary collision approximation (BCA). In these methods the movement of ions in the implanted sample is treated as a succession of individual collisions between the recoil ion and atoms in the sample. For each individual collision the classical scattering integral is solved by numerical integration.

The impact parameter p in the scattering integral is determined either from a stochastic distribution or in a way that takes into account the crystal structure of the sample. The former method is suitable only in simulations of implantation into amorphous materials, as it does not account for channeling.

The best known BCA simulation program is TRIM/SRIM (acronym for TRansport of Ions in Matter, in more recent versions called Stopping and Range of Ions in Matter), which is based on the ZBL electronic stopping and interatomic potential. It has a very easy-to-use user interface, and has default parameters for all ions in all materials up to an ion energy of 1 GeV, which has made it immensely popular. However, it doesn't take account of the crystal structure, which severely limits its usefulness in many cases. Several BCA programs overcome this difficulty; some fairly well known are MARLOWE, BCCRYS and crystal-TRIM.

Although the BCA methods have been successfully used in describing many physical processes, they have some obstacles for describing the slowing down process of energetic ions realistically. Basic assumption that collisions are binary results in severe problems when trying to take multiple interactions into account. Also, in simulating crystalline materials the selection process of the next colliding lattice atom and the impact parameter p always involve several parameters which may not have perfectly well defined values, which may affect the results 10–20% even for quite reasonable-seeming choices of the parameter values. The best reliability in BCA is obtained by including multiple collisions in the calculations, which is not easy to do correctly. However, at least MARLOWE does this.

A fundamentally more straightforward way to model multiple atomic collisions is provided by molecular dynamics (MD) simulations, in which the time evolution of a system of atoms is calculated by solving the equations of motion numerically. Special MD methods have been devised in which the number of interactions and atoms involved in MD simulations have been reduced in order to make them efficient enough for calculating ion ranges. The MD simulations this automatically describe the nuclear stopping power. The electronic stopping power can be readily included in molecular dynamics simulations, either as a frictional force or in a more advanced manner by also following the heating of the electronic systems and coupling the electronic and atomic degrees of freedom.

== Minimum ionizing particle ==
Beyond the maximum, stopping power decreases approximately like 1/v^{2} with increasing particle velocity v, but after a minimum, it increases again. A minimum ionizing particle (MIP) is a particle whose mean energy loss rate through matter is close to the minimum. In many practical cases, relativistic particles (e.g., cosmic-ray muons) are minimum ionizing particles.

An important property of all minimum ionizing particles is that $\beta \gamma \simeq 3$ is approximately true where $\beta$ and $\gamma$ are the usual relativistic kinematic quantities. Moreover, all of the MIPs have almost the same energy loss in the material which value is: $-\frac{dE}{dx} \simeq 2 \frac{\text{MeV}}{\mathrm{g}\,\text{cm}^{-2}}$.

== See also ==
- Radiation length
- Attenuation length
- Collision cascade
- Radiation material science
