= International Conference on Radiation Effects in Insulators =

Radiation Effects in Insulators (REI) is a long-running international conference series dedicated to basic and applied scientific research relating to radiation effects in insulators and non-metallic materials. It is held every second year in locations around the world.

The REI conference has a long history. Since the first conference was held in 1981, REI has been the international forum to present and discuss the latest achievements in the field of insulating materials modification through different kind of radiation (ions, electrons, neutrons, etc). The conference regularly attracts about 200 attendees.

== Topics covered ==
The REI conference covers a wide range of topics including the following.

=== Atomistic and Collective Processes of Radiation Effects ===
- Fundamental knowledge on atomistic and electronic defect production and stability
- Irradiation-induced microstructural evolution and material modifications
- Fundamentals, theory and computer simulations
- Advances in defect and material characterization
- Radiation response of nanomaterials
- Swift heavy ion irradiations
- Neutron irradiations
- Laser-solid interactions
- Electron-solid interactions

=== Irradiated Materials ===
- Simple and complex oxides
- Carbides and nitrides
- Polymers
- Ionic crystals
- Semiconductor and scintillator materials
- Glasses and silica
- Carbon-based materials
- Nanocomposites and nanostructured materials

==== Applications ====
- Nuclear materials: fission, fusion and waste forms
- Functional nanocomposites
- Photonic, bio-medicine and sensing materials
- Micro- and nano-patterning
- Materials processing with swift heavy ions and cluster beams

== Proceedings ==
The proceedings of REI-1 (1981) and REI-3 (1985) were published in the peer-reviewed journal Radiation Effects, renamed Radiation Effects and Defects in Solids in 1989. The proceedings of REI-1 are found in volume 64 [issues 1-4] and volume 65 [issues 1-4] of this journal. The proceedings of REI-3 are found in volume 97 [issues 3-4], volume 98 [issues 1-4], and volume 99 [issues 1-4] of this journal.

The proceedings of REI-2 (1983) and every REI conference since REI-4 (1987) have been published in the peer-reviewed Elsevier journal Nuclear Instruments and Methods in Physics Research B. These REI proceedings can be found in the following volumes of this journal: REI-2 (vol. 1), REI-4 (vol. 32), REI-5 (vol. 46), REI-6 (vol. 65), REI-7 (vol. 91), REI-8 (vol. 116), REI-9 (vol.141), REI-10 (vol. 166-167), REI-11 (vol. 191), REI-12 (vol. 218), REI-13 (vol. 250), REI-14 (vol. 266), REI-15 (vol. 268), REI-16 (vol. 286), REI-17 (vol. 326), REI-18 (vol. 379) and REI-19 (vol. 435). The proceedings of REI-20 and following conferences are reported in special issue collections of Nuclear Instruments and Methods in Physics Research B.

== REI conferences held ==
The complete list of REI conferences held up to 2025 is as follows. The chairman for REI-1 is taken from the Foreword to the REI-1 proceedings. The chairmen for the conferences from 1983 to 2009 are taken from the list of proceedings editors in

Conference	Year	Location	Chairpersons	Invited speakers
REI-1	1981	Arco, Italy	Paolo Mazzoldi	B. Henderson, W. B. Fowler, Noriaki Itoh, G. Littmark, Kurt Roessler, Paul Thevenard, Hj. Matzke, Roger Kelly, D. Fink, J. P. Biersack
REI-2	1983	Albuquerque, New Mexico, USA	George W. Arnold, James A. Borders	J. H. Crawford, B. R. Appleton, Paul Thevenard, Walter L. Brown, Ian H. Wilson, P. Pellas, W. A. Sibley, A. Manara, William J. Weber, M. C. Wintersgill
REI-3	1985	Guildford, UK	Ian H. Wilson, Jeffrey Belson	A. Marshall Stoneham, A. E. Hughes, R. Collins, Paolo Mazzoldi, Walter Brown, Gerhard Götz, Noriaki Itoh, Kurt Rössler, D. E. Harrison, Roger Kelly, J. P. Thomas, F. R. Krueger, J. Michl, K. Wien
REI-4	1987	Lyon, France	Paul Thevenard, Alain Perez	Walter L. Brown, C. W. White, Adolphe Chapiro, W. A. Sibley, Arthur H. Edwards, J. P Duraud, Richard F. Haglund, Jr., S. Della-Negra, Marcel Toulemonde, G. J. Clark, L. J. Lanzerotti, Hj. Matzke, William J. Weber, A. C. Marples, Rodney C. Ewing
REI-5	1989	Hamilton, Canada	John A. Davies, David A. Thompson	Roger Smith, Don M. Parkin, W. Johnson, C. Richard A. Catlow, Carl J. McHargue, K. Tanimura, P. Kelly, R. A. Divine, Harry Bernas, Giovanni Marletta, J. Guillet, Gerhard K. Wolf, G. Hubler, M. Szymonski
REI-6	1991	Weimar, Germany	Gerhard Götz	D. Ehrt, J. Biersack, H. D. Geiler, Noriaki Itoh, Gerhard Wolf, Ian Boyd, U. Jäger, N. Gerasimenko, H. J. Kreuzer, K. Wien, E. E. Baglin, Alain Perez, Paul Thevenard, Peter Townsend, Paolo Mazzoldi, F. Studer, L. Calgagno, Richard T. Williams, Charles Barbour, O. Meyer, K Gamo, Hj. Matzke, Kurt Rössler
REI-7	1993	Nagoya, Japan	Noriaki Itoh, Katsumi Tanimura	A. Marshall Stoneham, Richard T. Williams, Eugene Kotomin, Marcel Toulemonde, Rodney C. Ewing, Linn W. Hobbs, J.-M. Spaeth, Lloyd L. Chase, A. B. Devine, Steven J. Zinkle, M. Ikeya, Giovanni Marletta, G. Zimmerer, Paolo Mazzoldi, Richard F. Haglund, Jr., Carl. J. McHargue, Kurt Roessler, T. Sekine
REI-8	1995	Catania, Italy	Gaetano Foti, Orazio Puglisi	Walter L. Brown, A. Perez, Linn W. Hobbs, K. Tanimura, F. Priolo, Kurt E. Sickafus, E. Parilis, Steven J. Zinkle, Werner Wesch, Y. Kucherenko, G. Battaglin, C. N. Afonso
REI-9	1997	Knoxville, Tennessee, USA	Carl J. McHargue, William J. Weber	Eugene Kotomin, Elke Wendler, C. W. White, Lumin Wang, Hideo Hosono, Jean-Claude Pivin, Anthony J. Pedraza, Annie Dunlop
REI-10	1999	Jena, Germany	Werner Wesch, Gerhard K. Wolf	Alexander L. Shluger, William J. Weber, Trevor E. Derry, M. Hasegawa, Aleksandr Lushchik, Dorothee M. Rück, Eleanor E.B. Campbell, Gerhard K. Wolf, Cristoph Buchal, Barrett B. Potter, Francesco Gonella, Marcel Toulemonde
REI-11	2001	Lisbon, Portugal	Eduardo Alves, Carl J. McHargue	Paolo M. Ossi, Aleksandr Lushchik, Karl-Heinz Heining, Harry Bernas, Fei Gao, Hideo Hosono, Giovanni Mattei, Kurt E. Sickafus, Eric R. Hodgson, Albert Polman, Roberto Benson, Joel Davenas
REI-12	2003	Gramado, Brazil	Livio Amaral, Moni Behar, Fernando C. Zawislak	Carl J. McHargue, Kai Nordlund, Peter Sigmund, Wolfgang Bolse, A. Ibarra, Chiken Kinoshita, L. Rene Corrales, Linards Skuja, Koichi Kajihara, Siegfried Kalbitzer, Siegfried Klaumünzer, Mark C. Ridgway, Christina Trautmann, Giovanni Marletta, E. Balanzat, Chiara Maurizio, José Carvalho Soares, Marcel Toulemonde, Abdenacer Benyagoub
REI-13	2005	Santa Fe, New Mexico, USA	Kurt E. Sickafus, William J. Weber, Blas P. Uberuaga	Alain Chartier, Jean-Marc Delaye, David Simeone, Igor O. Usov, Roberto González, Lance L. Snead, Lionel Thomé, Jie Lian, Ulrich A. Glasmacher, Sergei O. Kucheyev, Manabu Ishimaru, Aleksandr Lushchik
REI-14	2007	Caen, France	Emmanuel Balanzat, Lionel Thomé, Marcel Toulemonde, Patrick Trocellier	Yanwen Zhang, Chris R. Stanek, D. Kanjilal, Eugene Kotomin, Kazuhiro Yasuda, R. Baragiola, A. Quaranta, F. Aumayr, Mark C. Ridgway, J. Jensen, Siegfried Klaumünzer, Alex Shluger, B. Thomas, Maik Lang, Frederico Garrido, G. Baldinozzi
REI-15	2009	Padova, Italy	Giovanni Mattei, Paolo Mazzoldi, Giancarlo Battaglin	Paolo Mazzoldi, Ram Devanathan, Maik Lang, R. Brusa, Marcel Toulemonde, Patrick Kluth, F. Chen, Harry Bernas, D. K. Avasthi, N. Kishimoto, Frédérico Garrido
REI-16	2011	Beijing, China	Yugang Wang, Yanwen Zhang, William J. Weber	Richard Catlow, Aleksandr Lushchik, Flyura Djurabekova, Linards Skuja, Peter D. Townsend, Jie Liu, Steven J. Zinkle, Lumin Wang
REI-17	2013	Helsinki, Finland	Kai Nordlund, Flyura Djurabekova, Jyrki Räisänen, Timo Sajavaara	Jan Meijer, Ricardo Papaléo, Jose Olivares, Olli Pakarinen, Patrick Kluth, Marika Schleberger, Orazio Puglisi, Izabela Szlufarska, Yugang Wang, Jiro Matsuo, Kostya Trachenko, Aurelien Debelle, Shengqiang Zhou, Giancarlo Rizza
REI-18	2015	Jaipur, India	Devesh K. Avasthi	Siegfried Klaumünzer, Clara Grygiel, Hiroshi Amekura, Ritesh Sachan, Vladimir A. Skuratov, Alain Claverie, Nadège Ollier, Jörg Schreiber, Olivier Plantevin, Stephanie Pellegrino, Satyabrata Mohaptra, Tiziana Cesca, Tapobrata Som, Akihiro Iwase
REI-19	2017	Versailles, France	Gael Sattonnay, Aurélie Gentils, Jean-Paul Crocombette, Nadége Ollier	Jacek Jagielski, Cameron Tracy, Wolfgang Bolse, Maria Eugenia Toimil Molares, Jacques O'Connell, Ambuj Tripathi, Katharina Lorenz, Andreas Wucher, Patrick Simon, Tetsuya Yamaki, Feng Chen, Samuel Murphy, A. I. Popov, Sandrine Miro
REI-20	2019	Astana, Kazakhstan	Vladimir Skuratov, Alma Dauletbekova	Helmut Schober, Aleksandr Lushchik, Isabelle Monnet, Miguel Crespillo, Andrej Kuznetsov, Sergii B. Ubizskii, Vladimir Pankratov, Feng Liu, Theo Andreas Scherer, Yaroslav Zhydachevskyy, Go Okada, Kai Nordlund, Ruslan Rymzhanov, Lars Breuer
REI-21	2023	Fukuoka, Japan	Kazuhiro Yasuda, Norito Ishikawa	Flyura Djurabekova, Aurelie Gentils, Marat Khafizov, Pawan Kulriya, Shinobu Onoda, Marco Peres, Maria Eugenia Toimil-Molares, Chenxu Wang, Shankar Dutt, David Hurley, Enrico Nichelatti, Vladimir Pankratov, Mamour Sall, Gihan Velisa
REI-22	2025	Madrid, Spain	José Olivares, Gastón García, Ovidio Peña	Alexander Shluger, Aleksandr Lushchik, Alicja Domaracka, Antonio Rivera, Eduardo Bringa, Eric C. O’Quinn, Ina Schubert, Joseph Graham, Junlei Zhao, Katharina Lorenz, Manabu Ishimaru, Mikhail Brik, Parswajit Kalita, Kazuhiro Yasuda
