= Radiation effects =

Radiation effects may refer to:

- Radiation damage on physical objects due to ionizing radiation
- Radiation exposure, a measure of the ionization of air due to ionizing radiation from photons
- Radiation-induced cancer, exposure to ionizing radiation is known to increase the future incidence of cancer, particularly leukemia
- Acute radiation syndrome, a collection of health effects that are caused by being exposed to high amounts of ionizing radiation in a short period of time
- Radiobiology, the effect on living things from ionizing radiation
- Radiation Effects and Defects in Solids, an academic journal formerly known as Radiation Effects

== See also ==
- Radiation poisoning (disambiguation)
