= Radiation effect =

Changes caused by radiation exposure

Radiation effect is the physical and chemical property changes of materials induced by radiation. One such phenomena is acute radiation syndrome, caused by exposure to ionizing radiation.

== Examples ==
- Bleaching of linen
- Formation of latent image in photography
- Embrittlement of optically transparent polymers such as lucite.

== See also ==
- Radiation sensitivity
- Radiation Effects and Defects in Solids (journal)
