= Campenot chamber =

Petri dish culture system

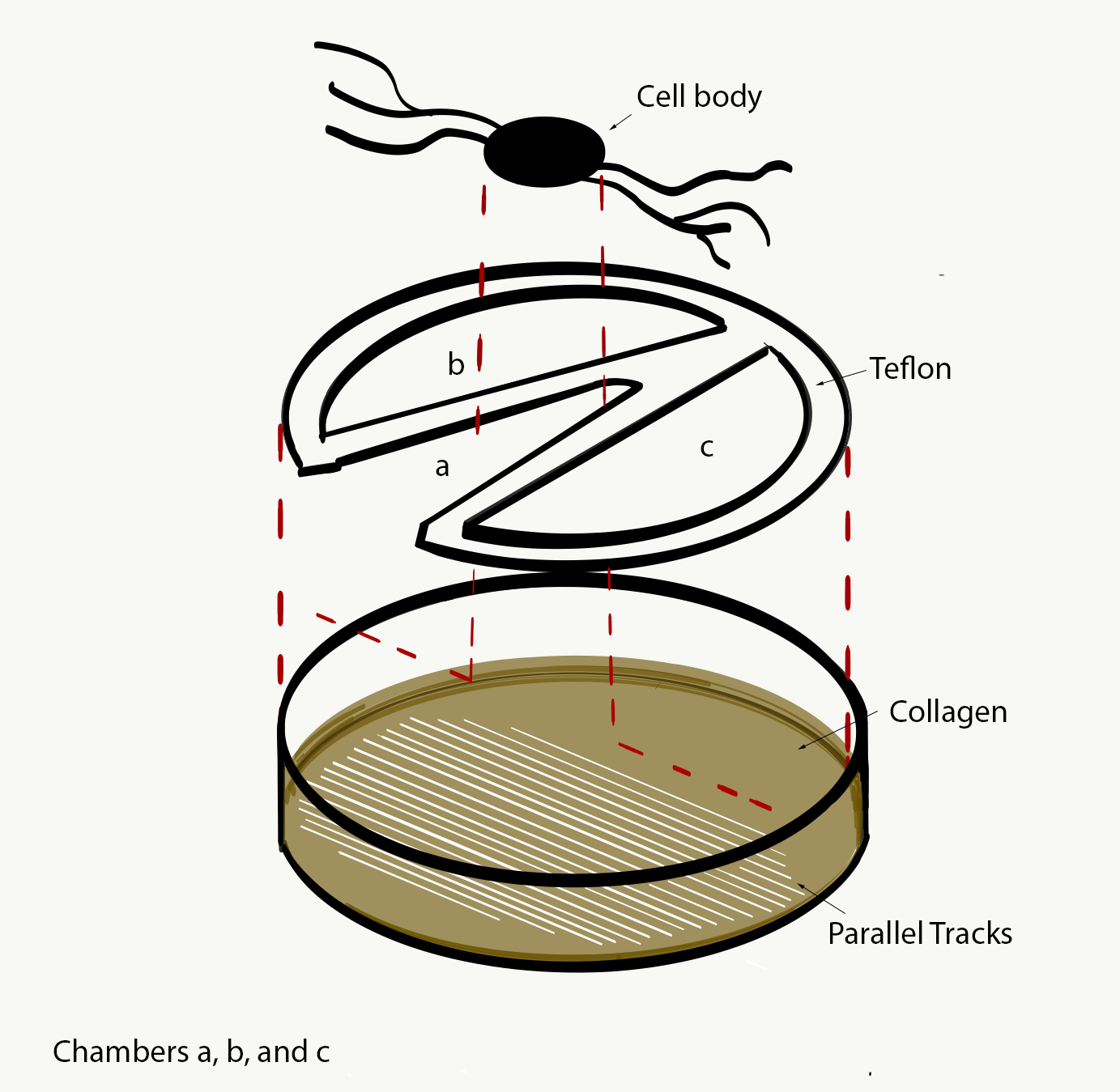
Compartmentalized Platform for Neuronal Cell Culture

A Campenot chamber is a three-chamber petri dish culture system devised by Robert Campenot to study neurons. Commonly used in neurobiology, the neuron soma or cell body is physically compartmentalized from its axons allowing for spatial segregation during investigation. This separation, typically done with a fluid impermeable barrier, can be used to study nerve growth factors (NGF). Neurons are particularly sensitive to environmental cues such as temperature, pH, and oxygen concentration which can affect their behavior.

The Campenot chamber can be used to study spatial and temporal axon guidance in both healthy controls and in cases of neuronal injury or neurodegeneration. Campenot concluded that neuron survival and growth depend on local nerve growth factors.

== Structure ==
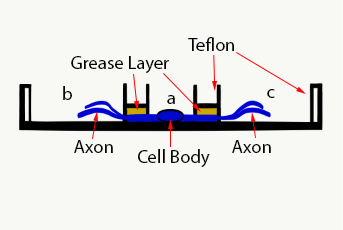
Side view campenot chamber

The Campenot chamber is made up of three chambers divided by Teflon fibers. These fibers are added to a petri dish coated in collagen with 20 scratches, spaced 200 μm apart, that become the parallel tracks for axons to grow. There is also a layer of grease that works to seal the Teflon to the neuron and separates the axon processes from the cell body. Refer to Side View of Campenot Chamber figure.

== History of use ==
The uniqueness of the design allows for biochemical analysis and application of a stimulus at either distal or proximal ends. Campenot chambers have been used for a variety of studies including culturing of iPSC-derived motor neurons to isolate axonal RNA which can then be used for molecular analysis. The chamber has also been modified to study degeneration and apoptosis of cultured hippocampal neurons induced by amyloid beta. A modified 2-chamber system was used to examine the axonal transport of herpes simplex virus by examining the transmission of the virus from axon to epidermal cells. Through this study, the virus was found to undergo a specialized mode of viral transport, assembly and sensory neuron egress.

Recent techniques in lithography have made these chambers a more appealing model system. New microfluidic approaches have been established to create compartmentalized devices as these by using soft lithography. A recent study demonstrated that a negative mold consisting of microchannels can be made using SU-8 photoresist on a silicon wafer arrayed at a height of 3 μm to restrict the cell body transport while allowing extension of neurites. The second layer of lithography defines compartment chambers that can be arranged uniquely to address a specific research question. The advantage of this approach provides easier visualization of cultures, a precise definition of compartments and channels, and a high device reproducibility.

== Limitations ==
A few limitations are associated with this device including leakage of the fluid chamber due to sealing with only one layer of grease, the device itself is rather difficult to assemble, advanced live cell microscopy imaging is difficult to integrate, and the technique can only be performed using neurons of the PNS that depend on neurotrophic factors, as applications with CNS neurons have been found to be ineffective.
