= DNQ =

DNQ may refer to:

- Diazonaphthoquinone, a chemical compound
- Did not qualify, failure to qualify for a sporting event
- Deniliquin Airport, IATA airport code "DNQ"
