= Diazonaphthoquinone =

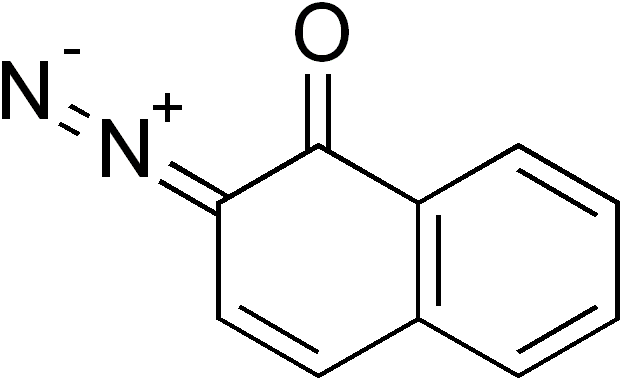

Names
- Preferred IUPAC name 2-Diazonaphthalen-1(2H)-one
- Other names 1,2-Naphthoquinone diazide

Identifiers
CAS Number	879-15-2
3D model (JSmol)	Interactive image
ChemSpider	7991089
PubChem CID	9815339
CompTox Dashboard (EPA)	DTXSID501028139
- InChI: InChI=1S/C10H6N2O/c11-12-9-6-5-7-3-1-2-4-8(7)10(9)13/h1-6H Key: URQUNWYOBNUYJQ-UHFFFAOYSA-N; InChI=1/C10H6N2O/c11-12-9-6-5-7-3-1-2-4-8(7)10(9)13/h1-6H Key: URQUNWYOBNUYJQ-UHFFFAOYAU
- SMILES: O=C(C(C=C2)=[N]=[N])C1=C2C=CC=C1

Properties
Chemical formula	C_{10}H_{6}N_{2}O
Molar mass	170.171 g·mol^{−1}
- Except where otherwise noted, data are given for materials in their standard state (at 25 °C [77 °F], 100 kPa). verify (what is ?) Infobox references

Diazonaphthoquinone (DNQ) is a diazo derivative of naphthoquinone. Upon exposure to light, DNQ converts to a derivative that is susceptible to etching. In this way, DNQ has become an important reagent in photoresist technology in the semiconductor industry.

Diazonaphthoquinone sulfonic acid esters are components of common photoresist materials. Such photoresists are used in the manufacture of semiconductors. In this application DNQs are mixed with Novolac resin, a type of phenolic polymer. The DNQ functions as a dissolution inhibitor. During the masking/patterning process, portions of the photoresist film are exposed to light while others remain unexposed. In the unexposed regions of the resist film, the DNQ acts as a dissolution inhibitor and the resist remains insoluble in the aqueous base developer. In the exposed regions, the DNQ forms a ketene, which, in turn, reacts with ambient water to form a base-soluble indene carboxylic acid. The exposed regions of the photoresist film become soluble in aqueous base; thus allowing the formation of a relief image during development.

== Chemical reactions ==
Upon photolysis, DNQ undergoes a Wolff rearrangement to form a ketene. The ketene adds water to form indene-carboxylic acid.
