= Radiation poisoning (disambiguation) =

Radiation poisoning may refer to:

- Acute radiation syndrome, the short-term systemic health effects of a large radiation dose.
- Chronic radiation syndrome
- Electromagnetic hypersensitivity, the false belief that exposure to electromagnetic fields result in adverse medical symptoms
- The ingestion of radioactive material, notably in the poisoning of Alexander Litvinenko and Eben Byers
- The action of neutron poisons that inhibit nuclear chain reactions
- Any of the negative health effects of radiation other than teratogenesis, including
  - Radiation burns
  - Radiation-induced cancer
  - Radiation-induced lung injury
  - Radiation-induced thyroiditis
  - Radiation-induced cognitive decline

== See also ==
- Radiation Sickness (disambiguation)
- Radiation effects (disambiguation)
