= Hardmask =

Material used in semiconductor processing

A hardmask is a material used in semiconductor processing as an etch mask instead of a polymer or other organic "soft" resist material.

Hardmasks are necessary when the material being etched is itself an organic polymer. Anything used to etch this material will also etch the photoresist being used to define its patterning since that is also an organic polymer. This arises, for instance, in the patterning of low-κ dielectric insulation layers used in VLSI fabrication. Polymers tend to be etched easily by oxygen, fluorine, chlorine and other reactive gases used in plasma etching.

Use of a hardmask involves an additional deposition process, and hence additional cost. First, the hardmask material is deposited and etched into the required pattern using a standard photoresist process. Following that the underlying material can be etched through the hardmask. Finally the hardmask is removed with a further etching process.

Hardmask materials can be metal or dielectric. Silicon based masks such as silicon dioxide or silicon carbide are usually used for etching low-κ dielectrics. However, SiOCH (carbon doped hydrogenated silicon oxide), a material used to insulate copper interconnects, requires an etchant that attacks silicon compounds. For this material, metal or amorphous carbon hardmasks are used. The most common metal for hardmasks is titanium nitride, but tantalum nitride has also been used.

== Bibliography ==
- Shi, Hualing; Shamiryan, Denis; de Marneffe, Jean-François; Huang, Huai; Ho, Paul S.; Baklanov, Mikhail R., "Plasma processing of low-κ dielectrics", ch. 3 in, Baklanov, Mikhail; Ho, Paul S.; Zschech, Ehrenfried (eds), Advanced Interconnects for ULSI Technology, John Wiley & Sons, 2012 ISBN 0470662549.
- Wong, T.; Ligatchev, V.; Rusli, R., "Structural properties and defect characterisation of plasma deposited carbon doped silicon oxide low-k dielectric films", pp. 133–141 in, Mathad, G.S. (ed); Baker, B.C.; Reidesma-Simpson, C.; Rathore, H.S.; Ritzdorf, T.L. (asst. eds), Copper Interconnects, New Contact Metallurgies, Structures, and Low-k Interlevel Dielectrics: Proceedings of the International Symposium, The Electrochemical Society, 2003 ISBN 1566773792
