= Radiation Sickness =

Radiation sickness may refer to:

- Radiation Sickness (video), a video by the thrash metal band Nuclear Assault
- Radiation poisoning, a sickness caused by exposure to radiation

== See also ==
- Radiation poisoning (disambiguation)
