= KPR =

KPR, originally known as Kodak Photoresist, is a photosensitive material used in photoengraving, Photogravure and photolithography. Once dried, KPR can be dissolved by several solvents. However, after exposure to strong ultraviolet light, it hardens and becomes insoluble by some of these solvents. It is also resistant to acid, ferric chloride and other chemicals used to etch metals.

The fundamental method of its use was first described in two US Patents, USP 2610120 and USP 2670287, assigned to the Eastman Kodak Company of Rochester, New York. These photo-resistant resins are formed from cinnamic acid esters, with the most preferable being polyvinyl cinnamate. While they were developed primarily for photolithography for high-speed print setting for uses such as newspaper printing, their perhaps highest value came from their ability to produce non-conducting layers on top of conducting layers to precise dimensions. This enabled the "printing" of large scale, closely placed conductive and non-conductive pathways to create binary gates. These were semi-conductors or the means to create semiconductors. This technology was utilized heavily by the Shockley 8, at the original Fairchild Semiconductor to produce more and more closely spaced semiconductors for computing. It is ironic that Kodak, the original patent assignee, did not really participate in the economic juggernaut that it created through this lithographic printing technology.
