= Replica (disambiguation) =

A replica is a copy that is relatively indistinguishable from the original.

Replica or replika may also refer to:

== Science and technology ==
- Replica trick
- Replication (computing)
- Replica, in microbiology, complementary copy of single stranded DNA.
- Replica, in microtechnology, complementary copy of a structure or pattern containing inverted detail.
- Replica (Plan 9), a client-server data replication system
- Replica 1, a clone of the Apple I computer
- BAE Replica, a BAE Systems aircraft research project
- T-Rex Replica, a digital delay guitar pedal made by T-Rex Engineering

== Arts and media ==
- Replicas (film), a 2018 American science fiction thriller film
- Repica, film directed by James Nguyen
- Replica, comic book character from Guardians of the Galaxy (1969 team)
- "Replica" (The Outer Limits), TV series episode
- Replica Magazine, an online magazine and advocate of collective journalism
- Replica, a novel series by Marilyn Kaye
- Replika, a type of being in the video game Signalis

=== Music ===
- Replicas (album), a 1979 album by Gary Numan and Tubeway Army
- Replica (Threshold album), 2004
- Replica (Oneohtrix Point Never album), 2011
- "Replica", a 2014 song by Maaya Sakamoto
- "Replica", a song by Beck from Modern Guilt
- "Replica", a song by Fear Factory from the album Demanufacture
- "Replica", a song by Sonata Arctica from Ecliptica
- Replica Replica, an album by Red Riders
- Replikas, a Turkish rock band

== Others uses ==
- ReplicaNet, a freeware network program
- Replika, an online chatbot service

== See also ==
- Replication (disambiguation)
- Replicant, a type of being in the film Blade Runner
