= Yanwen Zhang =

Chinese materials and nuclear engineer

Yanwen Zhang is a materials engineer and nuclear engineer whose research concerns radiation damage and radiation tolerance in alloys. Educated in China and Sweden, she has worked in Sweden, the United States, and most recently Canada, where she is a professor in the Queen's University at Kingston Department of Mechanical and Materials Engineering and holder of a Canada Excellence Research Chair in Impact of Radiation in Energy and Advanced Technologies.

== Education and career ==
Zhang was a student at Beijing Normal University in China, where she received a bachelor's degree in solid state physics in 1990 and a master's degree in materials science and engineering in 1993. She has two doctorates, one in nuclear engineering in 1998 from Lund University in Sweden, and a second one in 1999 from Beijing Normal University in 1999 in materials science and engineering. Continuing in Sweden, she received a docent qualification (the Swedish equivalent of a habilitation) from Lund University in 2004.

She worked as an assistant professor in ion physics at Uppsala University from 2000 to 2002. In 2003 she moved to the United States to become a research scientist at the Pacific Northwest National Laboratory, where she continued until 2010. From 2010 until 2022 she was a distinguished staff member at the Oak Ridge National Laboratory with a joint faculty position in materials science and engineering at the University of Tennessee, and deputy director of the university's Ion Beam Materials Laboratory. From 2022 until 2024 she was Directorate Fellow at the Idaho National Laboratory. She moved to her present position at Queen's University at Kingston, in Canada, in 2024.

== Recognition ==
Zhang was a 2005 recipient of the Presidential Early Career Award for Scientists and Engineers. She was named as a Fellow of the American Ceramic Society in 2022.
