= SU-8 photoresist =

Epoxy-based polymer

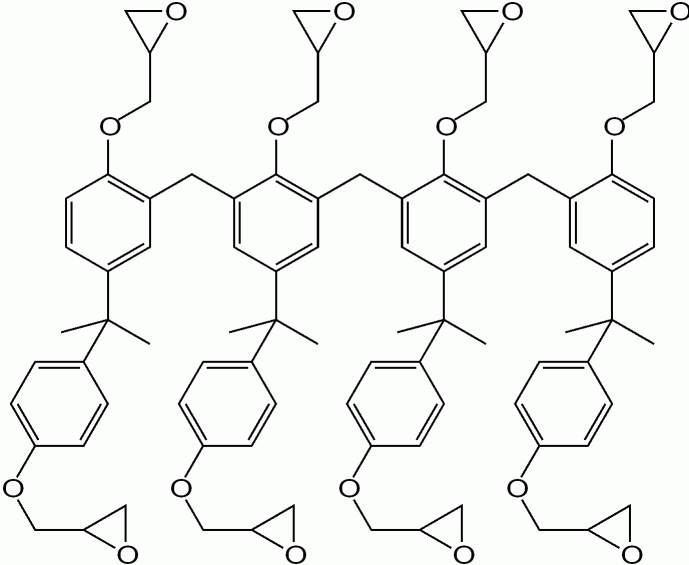
SU-8 molecule

SU-8 is a commonly used epoxy-based negative photoresist. Negative refers to a photoresist whereby the parts exposed to UV become cross-linked, while the remainder of the film remains soluble and can be washed away during development.

As shown in the structural diagram, SU-8 derives its name from the presence of 8 epoxy groups. This is a statistical average per moiety. It is these epoxies that cross-link to give the final structure.

It can be made into a viscous polymer that can be spun or spread over a thickness ranging from below 1 micrometer up to above 300 micrometers, or Thick Film Dry Sheets (TFDS) for lamination up to above 1 millimetre thick. Up to 500 μm, the resist can be processed with standard contact lithography. Above 500 μm, absorption leads to increasing sidewall undercuts and poor curing at the substrate interface. It can be used to pattern high aspect ratio structures. An aspect ratio of (> 20) has been achieved with the solution formulation and (> 40) has been demonstrated from the dry resist. Its maximum absorption is for ultraviolet light with a wavelength of the i-line: 365 nm (it is not practical to expose SU-8 with g-line ultraviolet light). When exposed, SU-8's long molecular chains cross-link, causing the polymerisation of the material. SU-8 series photoresists use gamma-butyrolactone or cyclopentanone as the primary solvent.

== History ==
SU-8 was originally developed at IBM in the 1980s as a negative-tone, epoxy-based photoresist for microelectronics applications. Commercial production was established in the 1990s by MicroChem Corp., which licensed the technology and became the primary supplier to the MEMS and microfabrication markets. In 2017, MicroChem was acquired by Nippon Kayaku Co., Ltd. of Japan and now operates as Kayaku Advanced Materials, Inc., an American subsidiary of Nippon Kayaku Co., Ltd, which remains the main commercial supplier of SU-8 resists.

SU-8 is now mainly used in the fabrication of microfluidics (mainly via soft lithography, but also with other imprinting techniques such as nanoimprint lithography) and microelectromechanical systems parts. It is also one of the most biocompatible materials known and is often used in bio-MEMS for life science applications.

== Composition and processing ==
SU-8 is composed of Bisphenol A Novolac epoxy that is dissolved in an organic solvent (gamma-butyrolactone GBL or cyclopentanone, depending on the formulation) and up to 10 wt% of mixed Triarylsulfonium/hexafluoroantimonate salt as the photoacid generator.

SU-8 absorbs light in the UV region, allowing fabrication of relatively thick (hundreds of micrometers) structures with nearly vertical side walls. The fact that a single photon can trigger multiple polymerizations makes the SU-8 a chemically amplified resist which is polymerized by photoacid generation. The light irradiated on the resist interacts with the salt in the solution, creating hexafluoroantimonic acid that then protonates the epoxides groups in the resin monomers. The monomer are thus activated but the polymerization will not proceed significantly until the temperature is raised as part of the post-expose bake. It is at this stage that the epoxy groups in the resin cross-link to form the cured structure. When fully cured, the high crosslinking degree gives to the resist its excellent mechanical properties.

The processing of SU-8 is similar to other negative resists with particular attention on the control of the temperature in the baking steps. The baking times depend on the SU-8 layer thickness; the thicker the layer, the longer the baking time. The temperature is controlled during the baking in order to reduce stress formation in the thick layer (leading to cracks) as the solvent evaporates.

The soft bake is the most important of the bake steps for stress formation. It is performed after spin coating. Its function is to remove the solvent from the resist and make the layer solid. Typically at least 5% of the solvent remains in the layer after the soft bake, however the thicker the coating, the harder it becomes to remove the solvent, as evaporating solvent through thick layers becomes increasingly difficult with coating thickness. The bake is performed on a programmable hot plate to reduce the skinning effect of solvent depletion at the surface creating a dense layer which makes the remainder of the solvent more difficult to remove. In order to reduce stress, the bake procedure is generally a two-step process made up of holding at 65 °C before ramping to 95 °C and holding again for a time dependent on the layer thickness. The temperature is then lowered slowly to room temperature.

When dry films are used, the photoresist is laminated rather than spin-coated. As this formulation is essentially solventless (less than 1% solvent remaining), it does not require a soft bake step and does not suffer stress or skinning. For enhanced adhesion, a post lamination bake can be added. This step is carried out in a similar way to the solution based resist - i.e. holding at 65 °C then 95 °C, the time dependent on film thickness.

After this stage the SU-8 layer can now be exposed. Typically this is through a photomask with an inverse pattern, as the resist is negative. The exposure time is a function of exposure dose and film thickness. After exposure the SU-8 needs to be baked again to complete the polymerization. This baking step is not as critical as the prebake but the rising of the temperature (again to 95 °C) needs to be slow and controlled. At this point the resist is ready to be developed.

The main developer for SU-8 is 1-methoxy-2-propanol acetate. Development time is primarily a function of SU-8 thickness.

After exposing and developing, its highly cross-linked structure gives it high stability to chemicals and radiation damage - hence the name "resist". Cured cross-linked SU-8 shows very low levels of outgassing in a vacuum. However it is very difficult to remove, and tends to outgas in an unexposed state.

== Newer formulations ==
Several modified versions of SU-8 have been introduced to address specific processing requirements. The SU-8 3000, TF6000, XFT and SU-8 Dry Film is the offerings of Kayaku Advanced Materials.

The SU-8 3000 series is a negative photoresist formulation designed for higher aspect ratio structures and improved adhesion, with typical film thicknesses ranging from 1 to 100 μm. It is commercially supplied by Kayaku Advanced Materials.

The SU-8 TF 6000 series is a transparent, permanent photoresist formulated for thin-film applications, with typical film thicknesses between 0.5 and 5 μm, and is used in advanced packaging and high-frequency electronic devices.

The SU-8 XFT is the thicker film version of SU-8 delivering improved adhesion and reduced coating stress for reliable high‑performance patterning. With a single‑coat capability of 50 to over 200 μm, SU‑8 XFT supports extremely thick layers while maintaining excellent imaging quality. It produces high‑aspect‑ratio structures exceeding 5:1 with near‑vertical sidewalls, making it ideal for demanding permanent microfabrication applications.

SU-8 Dry Film is a pre-cast, epoxy-based negative photoresist available in sheet form, designed to simplify handling and lamination. Nippon Kayaku, the parent company of Kayaku Advanced Materials, offers SU-8 Dry Film Resist in the United States in standard thicknesses of 20, 30, and 45 μm. It is typically used for applications requiring thicker coatings in microfluidics, MEMS, and advanced packaging.

SU-8 GLM2060 series of low-stress photoresist consist of epoxy GBL and silica formulation CTE 14.

SU-8 GCM3060 Series of GERSTELTEC conductive SU8 with nanoparticles of silver.

SU-8 GMC10xx Series of GERSTELTEC colored SU8 Red, Bleau, Green, black and others.

SU-8 GMJB10XX Series of GERSTELTEC low viscosities epoxy for inkjet applications.

SU8 GM10XX Series of Classic GERSTELTEC epoxy.

SUEX is a Thick Dry Film Sheet (TDFS) which is a solventless formulation applied by lamination. As this formulation is a dry sheet, there is high uniformity, no edge-bead formation and very little waste. These sheets come in a range of thicknesses from 100 μm to over 1mm. DJMicrolaminates also sell a thinner range, ADEX TFDS, which are available in thicknesses from 5 μm through to 75 μm.
