= Novolak =

Lightweight aldehyde- and phenol-derived polymer

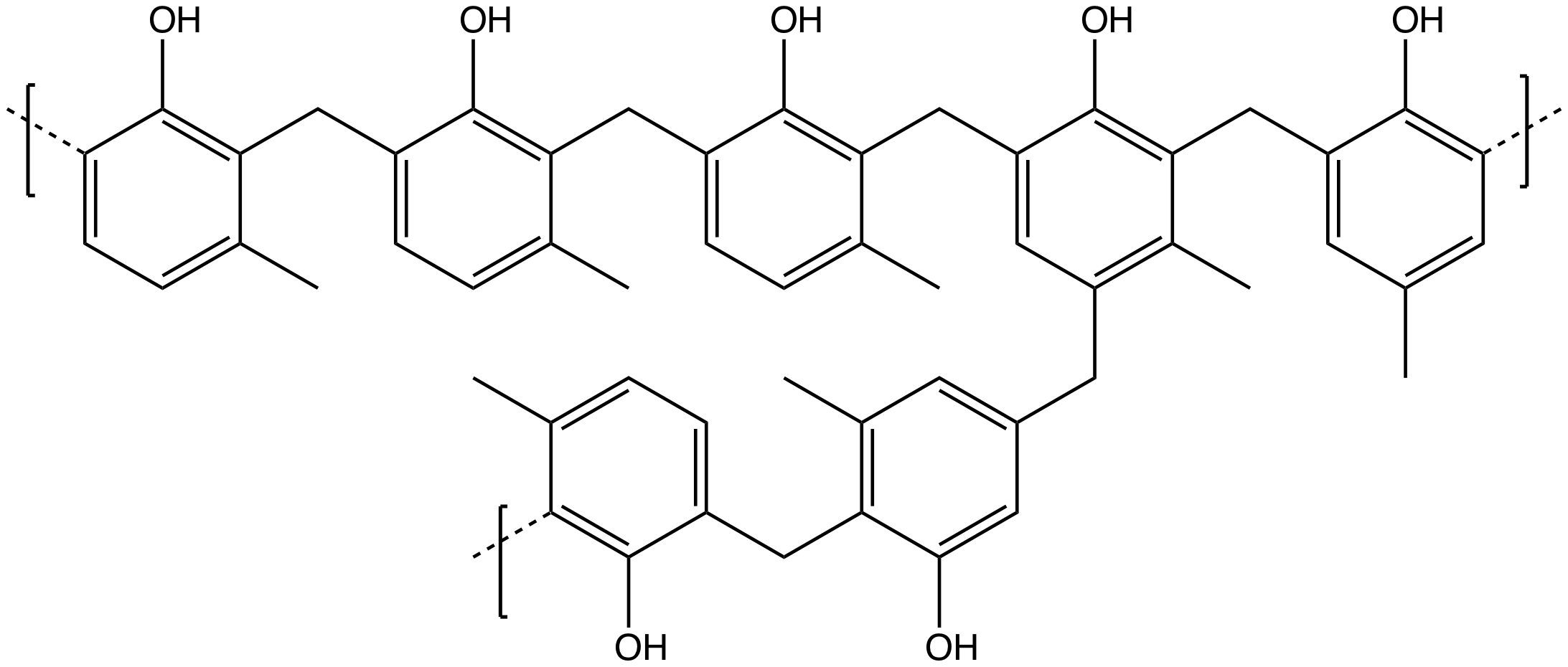
Segment of novolak, illustrating the predominance of cresol subunits and presence of crosslinking.

Novolaks (sometimes: novolacs) are low molecular weight polymers derived from phenols and formaldehyde. They are related to Bakelite, which is more highly crosslinked. The term comes from Swedish "lack" for lacquer and Latin "novo" for new, since these materials were envisioned to replace natural lacquers such as copal resin.

Typically novolaks are prepared by the condensation of phenol or a mixture of p- and m-cresol with formaldehyde (as formalin). The reaction is acid catalyzed. Oxalic acid is often used because it can be subsequently removed by thermal decomposition. Novolaks have a degree of polymerization of approximately 20-40. The branching density, determined by the processing conditions, m- vs p-cresol ratio, as well as CH_{2}O/cresol ratio is typically around 15%.

Novolaks are especially important in microelectronics where they are used as photoresist materials. They are also used as tackifiers in rubber.

== See also ==
- Phenol formaldehyde resin
- Epoxy
