= Microtechnology =

Technology with features near one micrometre

Microtechnology is technology whose features have dimensions of the order of one micrometre (one millionth of a metre, or 10^{−6} metre, or 1μm). It focuses on physical and chemical processes as well as the production or manipulation of structures with one-micrometre magnitude.

== Development ==
Around 1970, scientists learned that by arraying large numbers of microscopic transistors on a single chip, microelectronic circuits could be built that dramatically improved performance, functionality, and reliability, all while reducing cost and increasing volume. This development led to the Information Revolution.

More recently, scientists have learned that not only electrical devices, but also mechanical devices, may be miniaturized and batch-fabricated, promising the same benefits to the mechanical world as integrated circuit technology has given to the electrical world. While electronics now provide the "brains" for today's advanced systems and products, micro-mechanical devices can provide the sensors and actuators—the eyes and ears, hands and feet—which interface to the outside world.

Today, micromechanical devices are the key components in a wide range of products such as automobile airbags, ink-jet printers, blood pressure monitors, and projection display systems. It seems clear that in the not-too-distant future these devices will be as pervasive as electronics. The process has also become more precise, driving the dimensions of the technology down to sub-micrometer range as demonstrated in the case of advanced microelectric circuits that reached below 20 nm.

== Micro electromechanical systems ==
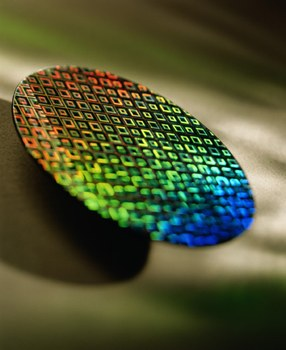
An etched silicon wafer

The term MEMS, for Micro Electro Mechanical Systems, was coined in the 1980s to describe new, sophisticated mechanical systems on a chip, such as micro electric motors, resonators, gears, and so on. Today, the term MEMS in practice is used to refer to any microscopic device with a mechanical function, which can be fabricated in a batch process (for example, an array of microscopic gears fabricated on a microchip would be considered a MEMS device but a tiny laser-machined stent or watch component would not). In Europe, the term MST (for "micro system technology") is preferred, and in Japan MEMS are simply referred to as "micromachines". The distinctions in these terms are relatively minor and are often used interchangeably.

Though MEMS processes are generally classified into a number of categories—such as surface machining, bulk machining, LIGA, and EFAB—there are indeed thousands of different MEMS processes. Some produce fairly simple geometries, while others offer more complex 3-D geometries and more versatility. A company making accelerometers for airbags would need a completely different design and process to produce an accelerometer for inertial navigation. Changing from an accelerometer to another inertial device such as a gyroscope requires an even greater change in design and process, and most likely a completely different fabrication facility and engineering team.

MEMS technology has generated a tremendous amount of excitement, due to the vast range of important applications where MEMS can offer previously unattainable performance and reliability standards. In an age where everything must be smaller, faster, and cheaper, MEMS offers a compelling solution. MEMS have already had a profound impact on certain applications such as automotive sensors and inkjet printers. The emerging MEMS industry is already a multibillion-dollar market. It is expected to grow rapidly and become one of the major industries of the 21st century. Cahners In-Stat Group has projected sales of MEMS to reach $12B by 2005. The European NEXUS group projects even larger revenues, using a more inclusive definition of MEMS.

Microtechnology is often constructed using photolithography. Lightwaves are focused through a mask onto a surface. They solidify a chemical film. The soft, unexposed parts of the film are washed away. Then acid etches away the material not protected.

Microtechnology's most famous success is the integrated circuit. It has also been used to construct micromachinery. As an offshoot of researchers attempting to further miniaturize microtechnology, nanotechnology emerged in the 1980s, particularly after the invention of new microscopy techniques. These produced materials and structures that have 1–100 nm in dimensions.

== Items constructed at the microscopic level ==
The following items have been constructed on a scale of 1 micrometre using photolithography:

- Electronics:
  - capacitors
  - diodes
  - resistors
  - sensors
  - thermionic valves
  - transistors
  - wires
- Machinery:
  - bearings
  - electric motors
  - gears
  - hinges
  - levers
- Fluidics:
  - channels
  - pumps
  - turbines
  - valves

== See also ==
- Microfabrication
