= Radiation Effects and Defects in Solids =

Journal

- Discipline: Physics
- Language: English

Publication details
- Frequency: Monthly
- ISO 4: Find out here

Radiation Effects and Defects in Solids is a peer-reviewed scientific journal that was established in 1969 as Radiation Effects. It obtained its current title in 1989 and covers radiation effects and phenomena induced by the interaction of all types of radiation with condensed matter: radiation physics, radiation chemistry, radiobiology, and physical effects of medical irradiation, including research on radiative cell degeneration, optical, electrical and mechanical effects of radiation, and their secondary effects such as diffusion and particle emission from surfaces, plasma techniques, and plasma phenomena. It is published monthly by Taylor & Francis.
