= Non-stoichiometric compound =

Chemical compounds that cannot be represented by an empirical formula

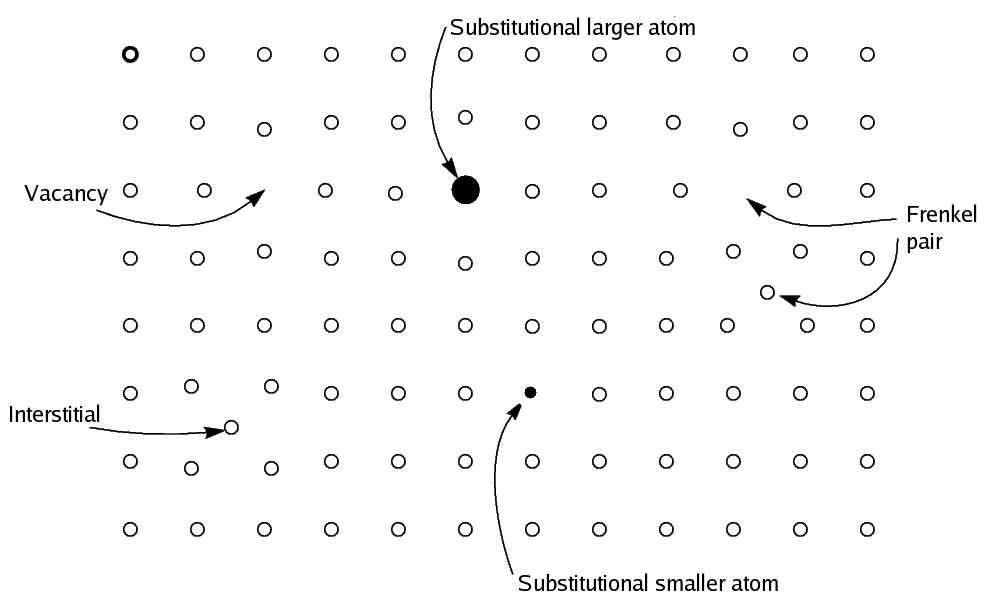
Origin of title phenomenon in crystallographic defects. Shown is a two-dimensional slice through a primitive cubic crystal system showing the regular square array of atoms on one face (open circles, o), and with these, places where atoms are missing from a regular site to create vacancies, displaced to an adjacent acceptable space to create a Frenkel pair, or substituted by a smaller or larger atom not usually seen (closed circles, • ), in each case resulting in a material that is moved toward being measurably non-stoichiometric.

Non-stoichiometric compounds are chemical compounds, almost always solid inorganic compounds, having elemental composition whose proportions cannot be represented by a ratio of small natural numbers (i.e. an empirical formula); most often, in such materials, some small percentage of atoms are missing or too many atoms are packed into an otherwise perfect lattice work.

Contrary to earlier definitions, modern understanding of non-stoichiometric compounds view them as homogeneous, and not mixtures of stoichiometric chemical compounds. Since the solids are overall electrically neutral, the defect is compensated by a change in the charge of other atoms in the solid, either by changing their oxidation state, or by replacing them with atoms of different elements with a different charge. Many metal oxides and sulfides have non-stoichiometric examples; for example, stoichiometric iron(II) oxide, which is rare, has the formula FeO, whereas the more common material is nonstoichiometric, with the formula Fe_{0.95}O. The type of equilibrium defects in non-stoichiometric compounds can vary with attendant variation in bulk properties of the material. Non-stoichiometric compounds also exhibit special electrical or chemical properties because of the defects; for example, when atoms are missing, electrons can move through the solid more rapidly. Non-stoichiometric compounds have applications in ceramic and superconductive material and in electrochemical (i.e., battery) system designs.

== Occurrence ==
=== Iron oxides ===
Nonstoichiometry is pervasive for metal oxides, especially when the metal is not in its highest oxidation state. For example, although wüstite (ferrous oxide) has an ideal (stoichiometric) formula FeO, the actual stoichiometry is closer to Fe_{0.95}O. The non-stoichiometry reflect the ease of oxidation of Fe^{2+} to Fe^{3+} effectively replacing a small portion of Fe^{2+} with two thirds their number of Fe^{3+}. Thus for every three "missing" Fe^{2+} ions, the crystal contains two Fe^{3+} ions to balance the charge. The composition of a non-stoichiometric compound usually varies in a continuous manner over a narrow range. Thus, the formula for wüstite is written as Fe_{1−x}O, where x is a small number (0.05 in the previous example) representing the deviation from the "ideal" formula. Nonstoichiometry is especially important in solid, three-dimensional polymers that can tolerate mistakes. To some extent, entropy drives all solids to be non-stoichiometric. But for practical purposes, the term describes materials where the non-stoichiometry is measurable, usually at least 1% of the ideal composition.

=== Iron sulfides ===
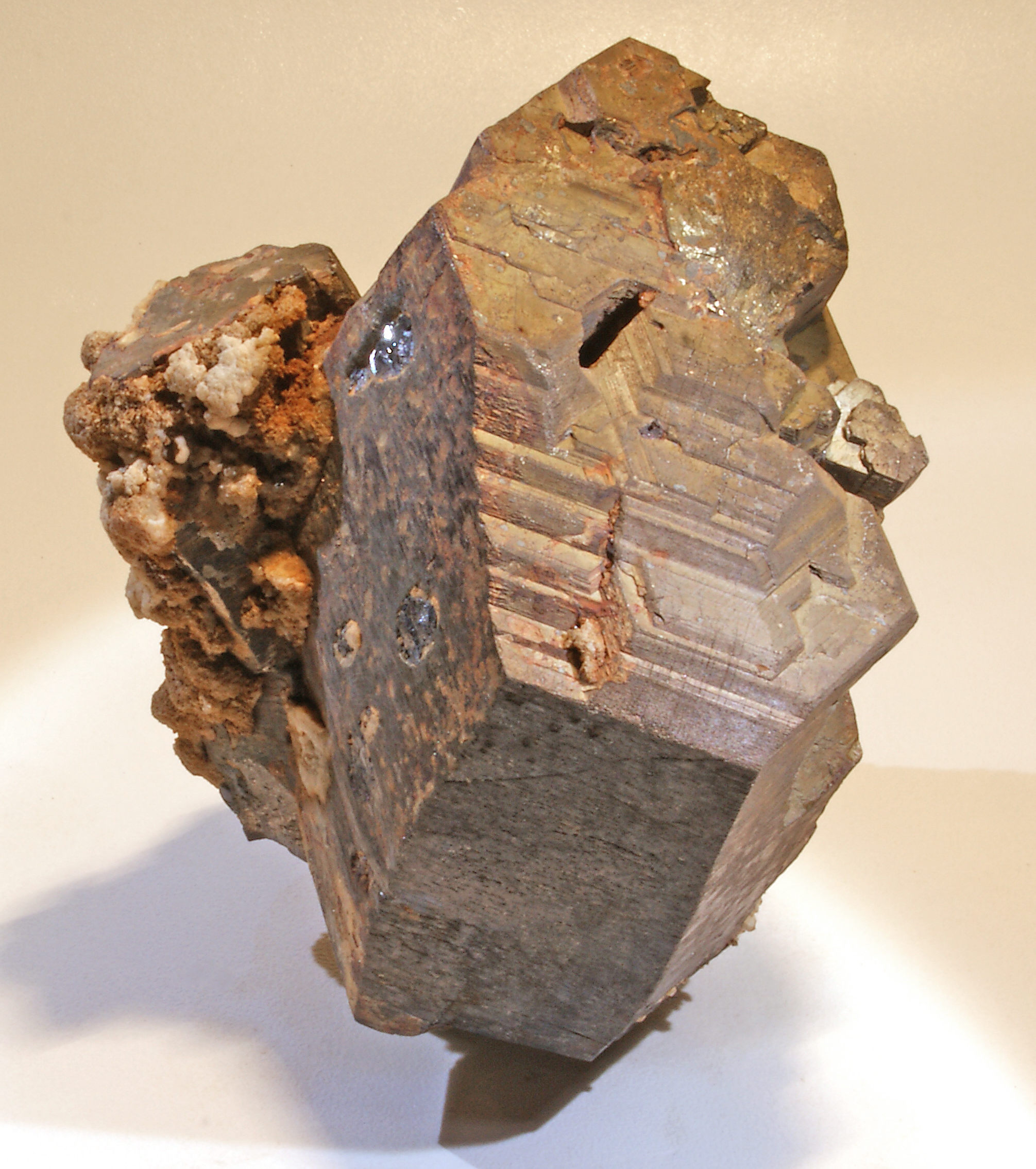
Pyrrhotite, an example of a non-stoichiometric inorganic compound, with formula Fe_{1−x}S (x = 0 to 0.2)

The monosulfides of the transition metals are often nonstoichiometric. Best known perhaps is nominally iron(II) sulfide (the mineral pyrrhotite) with a composition Fe_{1−x}S (x = 0 to 0.2). The rare stoichiometric FeS endmember is known as the mineral troilite. Pyrrhotite is remarkable in that it has numerous polytypes, i.e. crystalline forms differing in symmetry (monoclinic or hexagonal) and composition (Fe_{7}S_{8}, Fe_{9}S_{10}, Fe_{11}S_{12} and others). These materials are always iron-deficient owing to the presence of lattice defects, namely iron vacancies. Despite those defects, the composition is usually expressed as a ratio of large numbers and the crystals symmetry is relatively high. This means the iron vacancies are not randomly scattered over the crystal, but form certain regular configurations. Those vacancies strongly affect the magnetic properties of pyrrhotite: the magnetism increases with the concentration of vacancies and is absent for the stoichiometric FeS.

=== Palladium hydrides ===
Palladium hydride is a nonstoichiometric material of the approximate composition PdH_{x} (0.02 < x < 0.58). This solid conducts hydrogen by virtue of the mobility of the hydrogen atoms within the solid.

=== Tungsten oxides ===
It is sometimes difficult to determine if a material is non-stoichiometric or if the formula is best represented by large numbers. The oxides of tungsten illustrate this situation. Starting from the idealized material tungsten trioxide, one can generate a series of related materials that are slightly deficient in oxygen. These oxygen-deficient species can be described as WO_{3−x}, but in fact they are stoichiometric species with large unit cells with the formulas W_{n}O_{3n−2}, where n = 20, 24, 25, 40. Thus, the last species can be described with the stoichiometric formula W_{40}O_{118}, whereas the non-stoichiometric description WO_{2.95} implies a more random distribution of oxide vacancies.

=== Other cases ===
At high temperatures (1000 °C), titanium sulfides present a series of non-stoichiometric compounds.

The coordination polymer Prussian blue, nominally Fe_{7}(CN)_{18} and their analogs are well known to form in non-stoichiometric proportions. The non-stoichiometric phases exhibit useful properties vis-à-vis their ability to bind caesium and thallium ions.

== Applications ==
=== Oxidation catalysis ===
Many useful compounds are produced by the reactions of hydrocarbons with oxygen, a conversion that is catalyzed by metal oxides. The process operates via the transfer of "lattice" oxygen to the hydrocarbon substrate, a step that temporarily generates a vacancy (or defect). In a subsequent step, the missing oxygen is replenished by O_{2}. Such catalysts rely on the ability of the metal oxide to form phases that are not stoichiometric. An analogous sequence of events describes other kinds of atom-transfer reactions including hydrogenation and hydrodesulfurization catalysed by solid catalysts. These considerations also highlight the fact that stoichiometry is determined by the interior of crystals: the surfaces of crystals often do not follow the stoichiometry of the bulk. The complex structures on surfaces are described by the term "surface reconstruction".

=== Ion conduction ===
The migration of atoms within a solid is strongly influenced by the defects associated with non-stoichiometry. These defect sites provide pathways for atoms and ions to migrate through the otherwise dense ensemble of atoms that form the crystals. Oxygen sensors and solid state batteries are two applications that rely on oxide vacancies. One example is the CeO_{2}-based sensor in automotive exhaust systems. At low partial pressures of O_{2}, the sensor allows the introduction of increased air to effect more thorough combustion.

=== Superconductivity ===
Many superconductors are non-stoichiometric. For example, yttrium barium copper oxide, arguably the most notable high-temperature superconductor, is a non-stoichiometric solid with the formula Y_{x}Ba_{2}Cu_{3}O_{7−x}. The critical temperature of the superconductor depends on the exact value of x. The stoichiometric species has x = 0, but this value can be as great as 1.

== History ==
It was mainly through the work of Nikolai Semenovich Kurnakov and his students that Berthollet's opposition to Proust's law was shown to have merit for many solid compounds. Kurnakov divided non-stoichiometric compounds into berthollides and daltonides depending on whether their properties showed monotonic behavior with respect to composition or not. The term berthollide was accepted by IUPAC in 1960. The names come from Claude Louis Berthollet and John Dalton, respectively, who in the 19th century advocated rival theories of the composition of substances. Although Dalton "won" for the most part, it was later recognized that the law of definite proportions had important exceptions.

== See also ==
- F-Center
- Vacancy defect
