= Inversion domain boundary =

An inversion domain boundary (IDB) is a planar defect in crystalline materials that separates two regions with opposing crystallographic polarity. IDBs are most frequently observed in non-centrosymmetric polar semiconductors and layered materials, but they can also occur in any crystalline solid when sublattice occupancy is exchanged to yield a distinct domain. IDBs are important because they affect material properties and can be intentionally introduced or otherwise avoided during the production of high-quality crystal material.

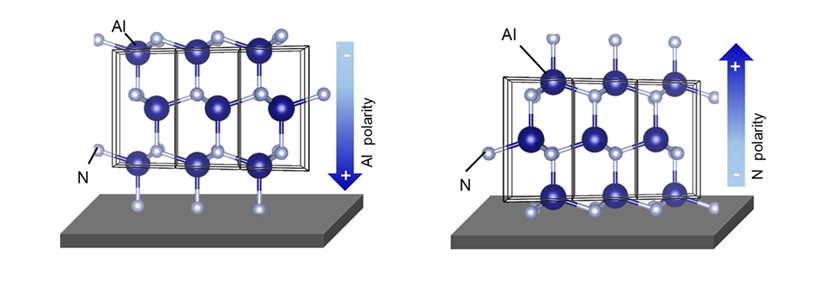
Structures of wurtzite AlN with opposite stacking sequences and polarization directions along the c-axis.

An IDB is similar to an antiphase boundary (APB), but they are not the same. An APB is a type of crystallographic defect that occurs in ordered materials because of a non-integer lattice translation. While the ordered sublattices are shifted out of phase, it does not necessarily produce two regions of opposite polarity. In certain polar ordered materials, however, it is possible for an APB to behave as an IDB, and this occurs where the relative occupancy of the sublattices has exchanged positions. For example, in zinc blende GaP grown on Si, antiphase domains exist in which the Ga and P atoms occupy the crystallographic sites of the neighboring domain. In this case, the boundary between the two antiphase domains is an APB, but it also serves as a polarity inversion boundary.

Twinning is another type of planar defect that can be confused with an IDB. A twin boundary occurs between two regions of a crystal that are related by a symmetry operation, such as rotation or reflection. In general, crystal twinning does not necessarily result in an exchange of sublattice occupancy but merely rotates a sublattice. For example, a Σ3 twin in a material with a face-centered cubic (FCC) lattice, such as copper, involves a 180° rotation around an axis perpendicular to the corner of the FCC crystal. In this case, the IDB is not produced because no inherent polarity has been reversed.

== Formation mechanisms ==
The formation of IDBs typically results from the interplay between interface structure, growth kinetics, and chemical environment across different material systems. The major formation mechanisms include:

=== Substrate defects and misoriented nucleation ===
IDBs may originate at an epitaxial interface due to atomistic defects of a substrate. When a polar crystal is grown on a substrate that does not enforce a specific polarization, islands with opposite polarity may be spontaneously nucleated. An example is GaN on sapphire (Al₂O₃), where the minimum step height on the substrate is different from the bilayer height of the GaN. This discrepancy effectively reverses the stacking order and seeds an N-polar domain. It has been theoretically shown that once initiated at the epitaxial interface, an inversion domain expands in the growth direction as the boundary is energetically unfavorable to terminate.

Even for an atomically smooth substrate, the stochastic nature of nucleation may lead to polarity inversion. If opposing polarities are initially randomly nucleated in islands, an IDB is formed after subsequent coalescence. Such a scenario is particularly relevant during the early stages of epitaxy or sputtering.

=== Thermodynamic stabilization by impurities and doping ===
Another mechanism involves the introduction of specific impurities during growth, which stabilizes reversed-polarity domains within the matrix. A good example is Si doping of AlN. While AlN typically grows Al-polar on standard substrates, studies have shown that Si addition into a growing film causes polarity inversion. This occurs during Al-polar growth of AlN on a seeded AlN substrate. Si can create an Al vacancy next to only those Si atoms that are incorporated into a crystal structure. As a result, a local inversion is favored. Controlled Si doping has been shown to reverse the overall film polarity from Al-polar to N-polar, whereas lower concentrations yield mixed-polarity films with isolated N-polar inversion domains.

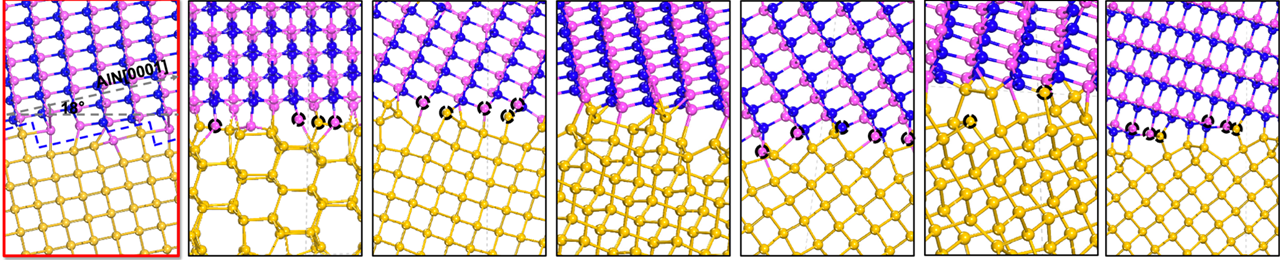
Atomic models of low-polar Si/AlN interfaces with different configurations and interface energy.

Oxygen impurities can also stabilize IDBs. Computational modeling of AlN IDBs shows that oxygen incorporation at the boundary reduces IDB formation energy. As a result, a smoother polarity inversion transition is facilitated due to the formation of transitional Al-O-N bonds. Thus, impurity segregation can thermodynamically stabilize IDBs that would otherwise be energetically unfavorable.

== Literature examples ==
- Wurtzite III-V semiconductors are classic examples of material systems with IDBs. In GaN, IDBs extend vertically along m-planes from the substrate to the surface, appear in the form of surface pits, and make up complex networks in nanowires. In AlN, IDBs separate Al- and N-polar domains and are sometimes intentionally used to design polarity-inverted multilayers for quasi-phase-matched nonlinear optics and periodic piezoelectricity. First-principles calculations have shown that O impurities trigger polarization inversion by forming Al-O-N bonding at the boundary and thus lowering the energy of IDBs.

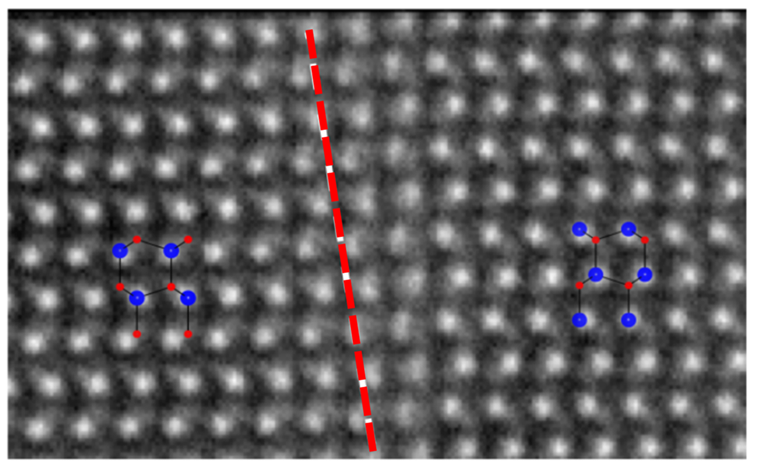
STEM image of an IDB in wurtzite AlN, separating an N-polar domain (left) and an Al-polar domain (right).

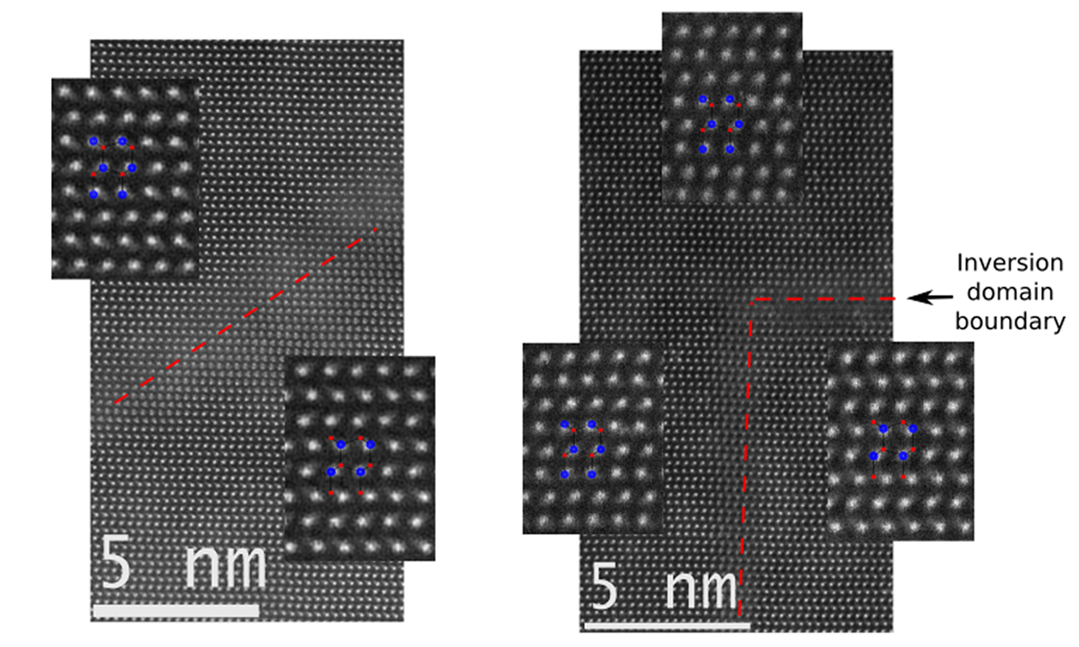
STEM images of inclined IDBs in wurtzite AlN. The dashed lines indicate the boundary traces, and the inset images highlight the local atomic stacking.

- IDBs are also commonly observed in two-dimensional (2D) layered materials, especially in transition metal dichalcogenides (TMDs) such as MoS₂ and MoSe₂. The monolayer 2H polytype of these materials does not possess a vertical mirror plane; therefore, there are two domains with an energetically degenerate orientation by 60° in-plane rotation. This rotation leads to the sublattice exchange of the upper and lower chalcogen atoms. In consequence, when these domains coalesce, the resulting 60° grain boundary is inherently an IDB. Atomic-resolution imaging has shown that these IDBs consist of defect motifs such as ordered chains of 4- and 8-membered rings that are mirror-symmetric across the boundary, in agreement with the reported sublattice exchange. Calculations indicate that the IDBs introduce metallic one-dimensional chains in the semiconducting matrix.

== See also ==
- Crystallographic defect
- Anti-phase domain
- Crystal twinning
- Semiconductor
- Single-layer materials
- Ferroelectricity
- Epitaxy
