= Surface properties of transition metal oxides =

Transition metal oxides are compounds composed of oxygen atoms bound to transition metals. They are commonly utilized for their catalytic activity and semiconducting properties. Transition metal oxides are also frequently used as pigments in paints and plastics, most notably titanium dioxide. Transition metal oxides have a wide variety of surface structures which affect the surface energy of these compounds and influence their chemical properties. The relative acidity and basicity of the atoms present on the surface of metal oxides are also affected by the coordination of the metal cation and oxygen anion, which alter the catalytic properties of these compounds. For this reason, structural defects in transition metal oxides greatly influence their catalytic properties. The acidic and basic sites on the surface of metal oxides are commonly characterized via infrared spectroscopy, calorimetry among other techniques. Transition metal oxides can also undergo photo-assisted adsorption and desorption that alter their electrical conductivity. One of the more researched properties of these compounds is their response to electromagnetic radiation, which makes them useful catalysts for redox reactions, isotope exchange and specialized surfaces.

== Bulk structures ==
The surface structures of transition metal oxides are not as well determined as their bulk crystal structures. A common approach is to assume the oxides are ideal crystals, where the bulk atomic arrangement is maintained up to and including the surface plane. Surfaces such as these are equivalent to those which would be generated by cleavages of the bulk crystal structure. However, such idealized surfaces will tend to minimize their surface energy often vis through reconstruction, to obtain the most thermodynamically stable surface. Hence their bulk structures are only a starting point

Most oxide crystal structures are based on a close-pack array of oxygen anions, with metal cations occupying interstitial sites. The close-packed arrays, such as face-centered-cubic (fcc) and hexagonal-close packed (hcp), have both octahedral and tetrahedral interstices.

=== Monoxides ===
Many compounds from first row of transition metal monoxides (MO), from TiO to NiO, have a rocksalt structure. The rock salt structure is generated by filling all octahedral sites with cations in an oxygen anion fcc array.

=== Dioxides ===
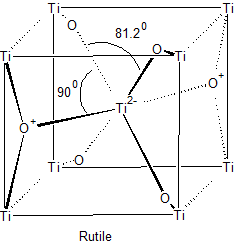
The rutile crystal structure of TiO_{2}

The majority of transition metal dioxides (MO_{2}) have the rutile structure, seen to the right. Materials of this stoichiometry exist for Ti, Cr, V and Mn in the first row transition metal and for Zr to Pd in the second. The rutile structure is generated by filling half of the octahedral sites with cations of the hcp oxygen anion array.

=== Trioxides ===
Few transition metals can achieve the +6 oxidation state in an oxide, so oxides with the stoichiometry MO_{3} are rare.

=== Ternary oxides ===
The structure of bulk binary oxides can be predicted on the basis of the relative sizes of the metal and oxide ions and the filling of holes in a close packed oxide lattice. However, the predictions of structure are more difficult for ternary oxides. The combination of two or more metals in an oxide creates a lot of structural possibilities. Also, the stoichiometry of ternary oxide may be changed by varying the proportions of the two components and their oxidation states. For example, at least twenty ternary oxide phases are formed between strontium and vanadium including SrV_{2}O_{6}, Sr_{2}V_{2}O_{5}, SrVO_{3} and Sr_{2}VO_{4}. The structural chemistry of ternary and more complex oxides is an extensive subject, but there are a few structures that are widely adopted by ternary oxides, such as the perovskite structure.

=== Perovskite structure ===
The perovskite structure, ABO_{3}, is the most widespread ternary phase. The perovskite structure is frequently found for ternary oxides formed with one large (A) and one small cation (B). In this structure, there is a simple cubic array of B cations, with the A cations occupying the center of the cube, and the oxide atoms are sited at the center of the 12 edges of the simple cube.

== Surface structures ==
A number of terms are important for the surface Gibbs energy of transition metal oxides, in particular thr polarity of the surface and the degree of coordinative unsaturation of a surface cation. Also, defect sites can have a huge impact on the surface stability.

=== Polarity of the surface ===
When a crystal of a binary oxide is cleaved to generate two new surfaces, each solid's charge remains neutral. However, the structure of the two newly created surfaces may or may not be the same. If the structures are identical, the surface will be dipoleless and is considered a nonpolar surface. If the structures are different, the surface will have a strong dipole and is considered a polar surface. Examples of nonpolar surfaces include the rocksalt (100) surface, the rutile (100), (110) and (001) surfaces and the pervoskite (100) surface. An example of a polar surface is the rocksalt (111) surface. In general, a polar surface is less stable than a nonpolar surface because a dipole moment increases the surface energy.

=== Degree of coordinative unsaturation of a surface cation ===
The degree of coordinative unsaturation of a surface cation measures the number of bonds involving the cation that have to be broken to form a surface. As the degree of coordinative unsaturation increases, more bonds are broken and the metal cation becomes destabilized. The destabilization of the cation increases the surface Gibbs energy, which decreases the overall stability. For example, the rutile (110) surface is more stable than the rutile (100) and (001) surfaces because it has a lower degree of coordinative unsaturation.

=== Defect sites ===
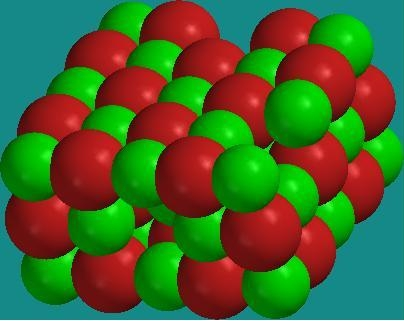
NiO rock salt crystal showing cation and oxygen vacancies

Defect sites can vjsmhr stability of metal oxide surfaces. Oxides exhibit an abundance of point defect sites. In rocksalt surfaces, oxygen and metal cation vacancies are the most common point defects. The vacancies can be produced by electron bombardment and annealing to extremely high temperatures.Oxygen vacancies are common, and cause reduction of the surface cations, which significantly affect the electronic energy levels. Steps and kinks are two other defects that impact rocksalt surfaces. These structural defects reduce the coordination environment of the four adjacent surface cations from 5 to 4. In rutile surfaces, the most common type of defect is oxygen vacancies. There are two types of oxygen vacancies, which result from either the removal of a bridging O^{2−} ions or the removal of an inplane O^{2−} ion. Both of these will reduce the coordination of the surface cations.

== Surface acidity/basicity ==
=== Extension of acid/base theories to solids ===
The surface of a metal oxide consists of ordered arrays of acid–base centres. The cationic metal centres act as Lewis acid sites while the anionic oxygen centres act as Lewis bases. Surface hydroxyl groups can serve as Brønsted acid or base sites as they can give up or accept a proton. The surface of most metal oxides will be, to some extent, hydroxylated under normal conditions when water vapor is present. The strength and the amount of Lewis And Brønsted acid–base sites will determine the catalytic activity of many metal oxides. Due to this there is a great need to develop standard methods for the characterization of the strength, concentration, and distribution of surface acid–base sites.

The concepts of Lewis acid–base theory and Brønsted–Lowry acid–base theory may be applied to surfaces, however there is no general theory that serves to determine surface acidity or basicity. The qualitative treatment of Brønsted acid base theory is based on the thermodynamic equilibrium constant (K_{a}) of acid–base reactions between individual molecules in homogeneous systems. This treatment requires measurement of equilibrium concentrations of reactants and products. The presence of two phases also provides a problem for the quantitative acid–base determination of solids. When an acid or base is adsorbed on to an oxide surface it will perturb neighbouring acid–base sites. This perturbation will inevitably influence the relaxation of the surface and make it impossible to have acid–base reactions at the surface which only involve a single surface site.

=== Structural relation to surface acidity/basicity ===
For metal oxides acidity and basicity are dependent on the charge and the radius of the metal ions as well as the character of the metal oxygen bond. The bond between oxygen and the metal is influenced by the coordination of the metal cations and the oxygen anions as well as the filling of the metal d-orbitals. The surface coordination is controlled by the face that is exposed and by the surface relaxation. Structural defects can greatly contribute to the acidity or basicity as sites of high unsaturation can occur from oxygen or metal ion vacancies.

=== Methods of determining surface acidity/basicity ===
==== Indicator method ====
Adsorption of an indicator molecule was first proposed by Hammett for ordering the strength of solid acids and bases. This technique is only applicable to surface Brønsted sites on metal oxides. According to Hammett, the strength of a Brønsted surface site can be determined by the Hammett acidity function,

$$H_0 = \ce{p}K_\ce{BH+} -\log \frac\ce{[BH+]}\ce{[B]}$$

where B is the basic indicator molecule. The concentration of Brønsted acid sites can be determined by titrating a suspension of the oxide with an acid/base indicator present. However, this method is subject to many problems. For instance only Bronsted acid sites can be quantified with this method. Metal oxide surfaces can have both Brønsted and Lewis acid sites present at the same time which leads to a nonspecific interaction between the oxide and the indicator. Also, as outlined in the theory section, the perturbation of neighboring sites upon adsorption of indicator molecules compromises the integrity of this model.

==== IR determination of adsorbed probe molecules ====
The adsorption of a very weakly basic or acidic probe molecule can serve to give a picture of Brønsted and Lewis acid–base sites. Infrared spectroscopy of surface sites and adsorbed molecules can then be used to monitor the change in the vibrational frequencies upon adsorption. A very weakly acidic probe molecule can be used to minimize disturbing neighboring sites so that a more accurate measure of surface acidity or basicity can be obtained. A variety of probe molecules can be used including: ammonia, pyridine, acetonitrile, carbon monoxide, and carbon dioxide.

==== Calorimetric and thermal desorption ====
Two promising methods for the description of the acid–base properties of metal oxides are Calorimetric measurements of adsorption enthalpies and Temperature Programmed desorption. The measurement of the heat of adsorption of basic or acidic probe molecules can give a description of acidic and basic sites on metal oxide surfaces. Temperature programmed desorption provides information about acid–base properties by saturating the surface with a probe molecule and measuring the amount that desorbs from the surface as a function of temperature. The calorimetric method provides a quantitative thermodynamic scale of acetate properties by measuring the heat of adsorption. Calorimetric methods can be considered to give a measure of the total acidity or basicity as it is not discriminate to either Lewis or Brønsted sites. However, when differential heats of adsorption are combined with other techniques, such as IR spectroscopy, the nature and distribution of acid–base adsorption sites can be obtained.

=== Case study of surface acidity/basicity ===
==== ZrO_{2} ====
representation of the zirconia surface

Zirconia exists in the monoclinic, tetragonal or cubic crystal system depending on the temperature. The surface acidity and basicity of the oxide depends on the crystal structure and surface orientation. The surfaces of zirconia have hydroxyl groups, which can act as Brønsted acids or bases, and coordination-unsaturated Zr^{4+}O^{2−} acid base pairs which contribute to its overall acid–base properties. Adsorption studies have shown that monoclinic zirconia is more basic than tetragonal, as it forms stronger bonds with CO_{2}. Adsorption of CO shows that the tetragonal phase has more acidic Lewis acid sites than the monoclinic phase, but that it has a lower concentration of Lewis acid sites.

== Electronic band structure ==
The bulk electronic band structure of transition metal oxides consists of overlapping 2p orbitals from oxygen atoms, forming the lower energy, highly populated valence band, while the sparsely populated, higher energy conduction band consists of overlapping d orbitals of the transition metal cation. In contrast to metals, having a continuous band of electronic states, semiconductors have a band gap that prevents the recombination of electron/hole pairs that have been separated into the conduction band/ valence band. The nanosecond scale life times of these electron/hole separations allows for charge transfer to occur with an adsorbed species on the semiconductor surface. The Potential of an acceptor must be more positive than the conduction band potential of the semiconductor in order for reduction of the species to commence. Conversely, the potential of the donor species must be more negative than that of the valence band of the semiconductor for oxidation of the species to occur.

Near the surface of a semi-conducting metal oxide the valence and conduction bands are of higher energy, causing the upward bending of the band energy as shown in the band energy diagram, such that promotion of an electron from the valence band to the conduction band by light of energy greater than the band gap results in migration of the electron towards the bulk of the solid or to a counter electrode, while the hole left in the valence band moves towards the surface. The increased concentration of holes near the surface facilitates electron transfer to the solid, such as the example shown in the figure of the oxidation of redox couple D-/D. In the absence of any mechanism to remove electrons from the bulk of the solid irradiation continues to excite electrons to the conduction band producing holes in the valence band. This leads to the reduction of the upward bending of the band energies near the surface, and the subsequent increase in excited electron availability for reduction reactions.

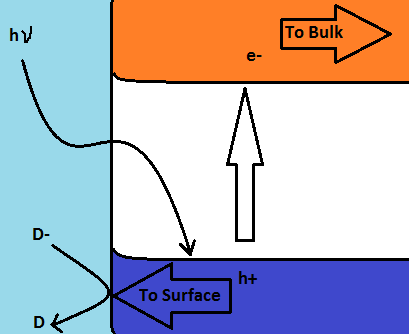
This band diagram shows the excitation of an electron to the conduction band, and the reaction of a hole in the valence band with a redox couple at the surface of the solid.

The following equations are useful in describing the populations of valence and conduction bands in terms of holes and electrons for the bulk metal. $n$ is the density of electrons in the bulk metal conduction band, and $p$ is the density of holes in the bulk metal valence band. E_{c} is the lowest energy of the conduction band, E_{f} is the Fermi energy (electrochemical energy of the electrons), E_{v} is the highest energy of the valence band, N_{c} is the effective mass and mobility of an electron in the conduction band (constant), and N_{v} is the effective mass and mobility of a valence band hole (constant).

$$n=N_{c}e^{\frac{-(E_c - E_f)}{kT}},$$
$$p=N_{v}e^{\frac{-(E_f - E_v)}{kT}},$$

where k is the Boltzmann constant and T is the absolute temperature in kelvins.

The use of quantum mechanics perturbation theory can aid in calculating the probability of an electronic transition taking place. The probability is proportional to the square of the amplitude of the radiation field, E_{0}, and the square of the transition dipole moment |μ_{if}|.

$$P \propto {E_o}^2 {|\mu_{if}|}^2$$

The quantum yield for an ideal system undergoing photocatalytic events is measured as the number of events occurring per photon absorbed. The typical assumption in determining the quantum yield is that all photons are absorbed on the semiconductor surface, and the quantum yield is referred to as the apparent quantum yield. This assumption is necessary due to the difficulty in measuring the actual photons absorbed by the solid surface. The relation between the quantum yield, the rate of charge transfer, k_{CT}, and the electron/hole recombination rate, k_{R}, is given by the following equation.

$$\Phi \propto {\frac{k_{CT}}{(k_{CT}+k_R)}}$$

Photoinduced molecular transformations at transition metal oxide surfaces can be organized in two general classes. Photoexcitation of the adsorbate which then reacts with the catalyst substrate is classified as a catalyzed photoreaction. Photoexcitation of the catalyst followed by interaction of the catalyst with a ground state reactant is classified as a sensitized photoreaction.

== Chemical properties of the surfaces ==
=== Photo-assisted adsorption and desorption ===
Adsorption and desorption can both be promoted by exposure of trans metal oxides to light, the predominant process being controlled by experimental conditions. Adsorption of oxygen by illumination of TiO_{2} or ZnO at room temperature with low pressure results in the adsorption of oxygen, while at high pressures illumination leads to photo-assisted desorption. At high temperatures the opposite effect is observed, with low pressure leading to desorption, and high pressure causing adsorption. Kase et al. conducted a study of the photo-assisted chemisorption of NO on ZnO, finding that under dark conditions a negligible amount of NO was adsorbed to the metal oxide, however under illumination ZnO irreversibly adsorbs NO, their sample showing no desorption after irradiation was stopped.

The process by which adsorption and desorption on metal oxide surfaces takes place is related to the photo generation of holes on the solid surface, which are believed to be trapped by hydroxyl groups on the surface of a transition metal oxides. These trapped holes allow photo-excited electrons to be available for chemisorption. Doping of a cation of either higher or lower valence can change the electronic properties of the metal oxide. Doping with a higher valence cation typically results in an increase in n-type semi-conductivity, or raises its Fermi energy, while doping with a lower valence cation should lower the Fermi energy level and reduce the metal oxide's n-type semi-conductivity. The process of doping indicates that a cation other than the transition metal cation experienced in the majority of the bulk is incorporated into the crystal structure of the semiconductor, either by replacing the cation, or interstitially adding to the matrix. Doping of ZnO with Li leads to greater photo-adsorption of oxygen, while doping with Ga or Al suppresses photo-adsorption of oxygen. Trends in photo-adsorption tend to follow trends in photo-oxidative catalysis, as shown by the high degree of photo-oxidative catalytic activity of TiO_{2} and ZnO, while other transition elements like V_{2}O_{5} shows no photo-oxidative catalytic response as well as no photo-activated adsorption of oxygen.

== See also ==
- Photocatalysis
