= Schottky =

Notable people named Schottky include:

- Ernst Max Schottky, botanist
- Walter H. Schottky, physicist
- Friedrich Schottky, mathematician

Other links:

- Schottky diode and Schottky barrier in electronics and physics
- Schottky transistor in electronics
- Schottky group in mathematics
- Schottky defect in condensed matter physics
- Schottky anomaly in condensed matter physics
- Schottky noise in electronics, described mathematically by Walter H. Schottky, and also known as shot noise
