= F-center =

Type of crystallographic defect

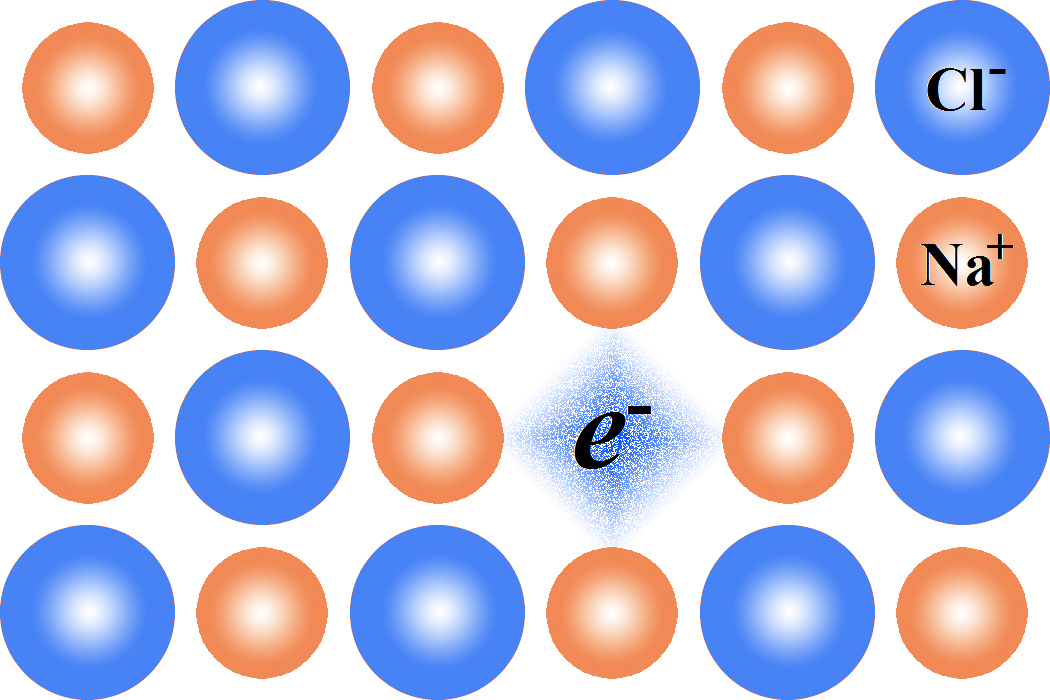
F-center in an NaCl crystal

An F-center or color center or Farbe center (from the original German Farbzentrum, where Farbe means color and zentrum means center) is a type of crystallographic defect in which an anionic vacancy in a crystal lattice is occupied by one or more unpaired electrons. Electrons in such a vacancy in a crystal lattice tend to absorb light in the visible spectrum such that a material that is usually transparent becomes colored. The greater the number of F centers, the more intense the color of the compound. F centers are a type of color center.

This is used to identify many compounds, especially zinc oxide (yellow).

== History ==
Before the discovery of point defects it was already known that some crystals can be discolored using various methods. In 1830 T.J. Pearsall discovered that fluorspar could be discolored using violet light. Thirty years later similar results were achieved by melting crystals together with a specific metal. In 1921 Wilhelm Röntgen extensively measured rock salts. One set of these tests measured a photoelectric conductivity 40,000 times larger, after the salt was radiated with x-rays. A similar result to x-rays was accomplished by coloring the crystals with metal vapors. The photoelectric effect mainly happened around specific wavelengths, which was later found to be non-colloidal in nature.

The discolorations were later named F centers, as in Farbe, the German word for color. These defects were extensively studied by Robert Wichard Pohl and his institute at the University of Göttingen since 1920. One of his assistants, Erich Mollwo concluded in 1933 that these F centers are atomic crystal defects. Around this time people started to assert these defects were unpaired electrons. The vacancy model was first described by Pohl in 1937 but still was considered tentative. It was formalized theoretically by Nevill Mott and Ronald Wilfred Gurney in 1940. It took until 1957 to find conclusive experimental evidence using electron spin resonance.

== Occurrences ==
F centers can occur naturally in compounds (particularly metallic oxides) because when heated to high temperature the ions become excited and are displaced from their normal crystallographic positions, leaving behind some electrons in the vacated spaces. This effect is also exhibited by ionic compounds containing metal-excess defects.

Often F centers are paramagnetic and can be studied by electron paramagnetic resonance techniques. The F centers most commonly studied are those that occur in alkali metal halides. Alkali metal halides are normally transparent; they do not show absorption from the far ultraviolet into the far infrared. Thus any changes in optical absorption can easily be detected and studied. The absorption band of F centers in sodium chloride is located in the blue part of the visible spectrum, giving a sodium chloride crystal with sufficient F center defects a yellow tinge. In other alkali chlorides the wavelength of the F center absorption band ranges from violet to yellow light. The formation of F centers is the reason that some crystals like lithium chloride, potassium chloride, and zinc oxide become pink, lilac and yellow, respectively, when heated.

Though F centers have been observed in other materials, they are generally not the cause for coloration in those materials. There are few examples of naturally occurring F centers causing colorations. One possible candidate is the mineral Blue John. This is a form of fluorite, CaF_{2}. Although it has not been confirmed, it is believed that the color is caused by electron F centers. It is thought that this F center is formed due to nearby uranium deposits in the rock: the radiation from radioactive decay is energetic enough to form the F center.

Another example of an F center found in nature is a relatively long-lived F center found in sapphire through luminescence, which had a duration of about 36 ms in one study.

== Types ==
There are different types of electron centers, depending on the material and radiation energy. An F center is usually a position in a lattice where an anion, a negatively charged ion, is replaced by an electron. An H center (a halogen interstitial) is in a sense the opposite to an F center, so that when the two come into contact in a crystal they combine and cancel out both defects. This process can be photoinduced, e.g., using a laser.

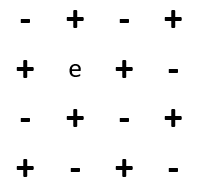
Simple F center. Positive ions are shown as + and negative halide ions as -. The electron e is in the anion vacancy.

=== Single vacancy F center ===
Sometimes the F center might acquire an additional electron, making the F center negatively charged, such that it is called an F^{−} center. Similarly, an F center missing an electron is an F^{+} center. It is also possible to have a -2e charged anion, needing 2 electrons to form an F center. Adding or taking away an electron will make it an F^{−} or F^{+} center respectively according to the convention.

Another type of a single vacancy F center is the F_{A} center which consists of an F center with one neighboring positive ion replaced by a positive ion of a different kind. These F_{A} centers are divided into two groups, F_{A}(I) and F_{A}(II) depending on the type of replacement ion. F_{A}(I) centers have similar properties as regular F centers, whereas F_{A}(II) centers cause two potential wells to form in the excited state due to the repositioning of a halide ion. Similar to the F_{A} is the F_{B} center, which consists of an F center with two neighboring positive ions replaced by a positive ion of a different kind. F_{B} centers are also divided into two groups, F_{B}(I) and F_{B}(II), with similar behavior to the F_{A}(I) and F_{A}(II) centers. Due to the statistical nature of the distribution of impurity ions, F_{B} centers are much more rare than F_{A} centers.

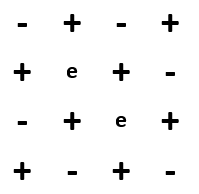
Configuration of F2 center. The electrons are in diagonally neighboring lattice sites.

=== Complex F center ===
Combinations of neighboring F centers due to neighboring anion vacancies will be called, for two and three neighbors respectively, F_{2} and F_{3} centers. Larger aggregates of F centers is certainly possible, but the details of its behavior are yet unknown. An F_{2} center can also be ionized, and form an F_{2}^{+} center. When this type is found next to a cation impurity, this is an (F_{2}^{+})_{A} center.

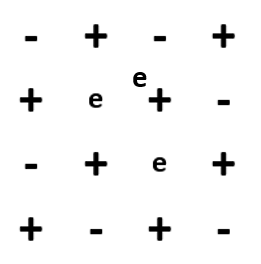
Configuration of F3 center. The electrons are in a triangle configuration, where the third F center is in the atomic layer above the other two.

=== F_{s} centers ===
F centers can appear anywhere in the crystal but have substantially different properties if formed on the surface of an oxide crystal, where they are called F_{s} centers. Electrons bound in F_{s} centers have smaller transition energies compared to bulk F centers. Surface F centers in alkali halide crystals behave as a slightly perturbed bulk center, with a shift of below -0.1eV. They tend to protrude from the surface compared to regular lattice points as well. With F centers being more weakly bound than electrons at regular lattice sites, they work as a catalyst for adsorption. However, this means that these defects quickly deteriorate in open air by absorbing oxygen, but are reversible by removing the oxygen from the environment. The ESR spectrum of F_{s} center is temperature dependent in the hyperfine structure in oxides. This must arise from an increasing overlap of the unpaired electron wavefunction at the Nucleus of the positive ion. F_{s} centers can be changed or destroyed by heating. The defects in alkali halide crystals are destroyed at low temperatures. Crystals start to slowly discolor at 200 K. Higher temperatures are required to destroy F_{s} centers in oxides (570 K for CaO). In oxides it is possible to create complex F_{s} centers by annealing.

== Fabrication ==
=== Irradiation ===
The first F centers created were in alkali halide crystals. These halides were exposed to high-energy radiation, such as X-rays, gamma radiation or a tesla coil.

There are three mechanisms of energy absorption by radiation:

a) Exciton formation. This amounts to an excitation of a valence electron in a halide ion. The energy gained (typically 7 or 8 eV) will partly be lost again through the emission of a luminescent photon. The rest of the energy is available for displacing ions. This energy radiates through the lattice as heat. However, it turns out that his energy is too low to move ions and therefore not capable of generating F centers.

b) Single ionization. This corresponds to separating an electron from a halide ion; the energy required is about 2 eV more than exciton formation. One can imagine that the halide ion which lost an electron, is not properly bound on its lattice site any more. It is possible that it will move through the lattice. The created vacancy can now trap the electron, creating the F center. If the halide ion recaptures the electron first, it can release more thermal energy than by exciton formation (2 eV more) and it could cause other ions to move also.

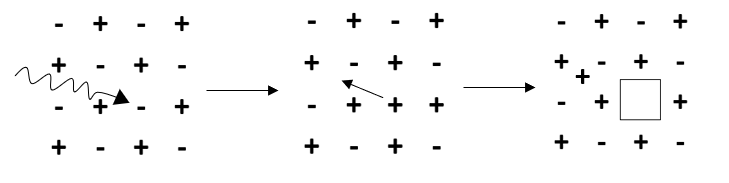
The process of multiple ionization. A photon interacts with the negative halide ion ionizing it twice, turning it into a positive ion. Due to the instability of the position it will move, leaving a vacancy.

c) Multiple ionization. This process requires the most energy. A photon interacts with a halide ion, ionizing it twice, leaving it positively charged. The ion remaining is very unstable and will quickly move to another position, leaving a vacancy which can trap an electron to become an F center. To free two electrons, about 18 eV is required (in the case of KCl or NaCl). Research suggests about one double ionization occurs in ten single ionizations. However, the created positive halide ion will easily and quickly adopt an electron; making it unable to create the F center.

The most likely mechanism of F center creation is not yet determined. Both are possible and likely, but which once occurs the most is unknown.

The formation of an F_{2} center is very similar. An F center is ionized and becomes a vacancy; the electron moves through the material to bind to another F center, which becomes an F^{−} center. The electron vacancy moves through the material and ends up next to the F^{−} center, which gives its electron back to the vacancy, forming two neighboring F centers, i.e. an F_{2} center.

=== Additive coloring ===
A different way of creating color centers is by additive coloring. A crystal with F centers is chemically equivalent as a perfect crystal plus stoichiometric excess of the alkali metal. This is done by heating the crystal to a high temperature in the vapour of the corresponding metal. The temperature is bounded by its melting point and the temperature at which colloids form, e.g. for KCl between ~400 and 768°C. Metal atoms are captured on the surface of the crystal, where they are ionized, and the valence electron is shunted to the crystal lattice. Since this process happens at high temperatures, the mobility of ions is also high. A negative ion will move towards the newly formed ion. This leaves behind an anionic vacancy which can trap the electron to form an F center. Afterwards the crystal is quenched to prevent the F centers moving through the crystal to form colloids. An example of this process is heating NaCl in a metallic sodium atmosphere.

Na^{0} → Na^{+} + e^{−}
Na^{+} is incorporated into the NaCl crystal after giving up an electron.
A Cl^{−} vacancy is generated to balance the excess Na^{+}. The effective positive charge of the Cl^{−} vacancy traps the electron released by the Na atom.

In oxides it is possible to additively color a crystal with a different metal than the cation. The resulting absorption spectra are substantially the same as if the component metal was used.

=== Low temperature vapour deposition ===
It is possible to create stable F_{s} centers on alkali halide crystals using vapour depositions at low temperatures, below -200 °C.

== Lasers ==
Certain F centers have optical absorption and emission bands that makes them useful as laser gain media. Lasers based on color centers are operated analogously to dye lasers. They provide a wavelength range from 0.8 to 4.0 μm, the near infrared region of light, thus picking up where dye lasers fail to operate. Lasers that operate in the near infrared region of the spectrum are used as a light source in infrared spectroscopy, used to study for instance molecular vibrations.

Only certain F centers are suitable for application in color center lasers, known as laser-active F centers. Simple F centers are not laser-active, but more complex F centers have been shown to form stable color center lasers. These are namely F_{A}(II), F_{B}(II), F_{2}^{+} and (F_{2}^{+})_{A} centers. Other even more complex F centers are potentially laser-active, but they do not play a significant role in color center lasers physics. Examples of a material with F_{A} centers used in color center lasers are crystals of potassium chloride (KCl) or rubidium chloride (RbCl) doped with lithium chloride (LiCl), containing F_{Li}-centers. These crystals have been found to be good materials for color center lasers with emission lines of wavelengths between 2.45 and 3.45 μm.

F centers usually have an absorption band in visible range, and the emission is Stokes shifted to longer wavelengths. The differences in peaks is often larger than a factor of 2 and the resulting emissions are near infrared. However at lower temperatures the shift becomes smaller, though there are some crystals that are able to emit visible light. One such example is powdered MgO, treated with additive coloring, emitting violet-blue light by absorbing violet light in vacuum.

== See also ==
- Electride, a crystal where all the anions are electrons.
- Vacancy defect
- Schottky defect
- Frenkel defect
- Nitrogen-vacancy center
