= Thermally stimulated current spectroscopy =

Experimental method

Thermally stimulated current (TSC) spectroscopy (not to be confused with thermally stimulated depolarization current) is an experimental technique which is used to study energy levels in semiconductors or insulators (organic or inorganic). Energy levels are first filled either by optical or electrical injection usually at a relatively low temperature, subsequently electrons or holes are emitted by heating to a higher temperature. A curve of emitted current will be recorded and plotted against temperature, resulting in a TSC spectrum. By analyzing TSC spectra, information can be obtained regarding energy levels in semiconductors or insulators.

A driving force is required for emitted carriers to flow when the sample temperature is being increased. This driving force can be an electric field or a temperature gradient. Usually, the driving force adopted is an electric field; however, electron traps and hole traps cannot be distinguished. If the driving force adopted is a temperature gradient, electron traps and hole traps can be distinguished by the sign of the current. TSC based on a temperature gradient is also known as "Thermoelectric Effect Spectroscopy" (TEES) according to 2 scientists (Santic and Desnica) from ex-Yugoslavia; they demonstrated their technique on semi-insulating gallium arsenide (GaAs). (Note: TSC based on a temperature gradient was invented before Santic and Desnica and applied to the study of organic plastic materials. However, Santic and Desnica applied TSC based on a temperature gradient to study a technologically important semiconductor material and coined a new name, TEES, for it.)

Historically, Frei and Groetzinger published a paper in German in 1936 with the title "Liberation of electrical energy during the fusion of electrets" (English translation of the original title in German). This may be the first paper on TSC. Before the invention of deep-level transient spectroscopy (DLTS), thermally stimulated current (TSC) spectroscopy was a popular technique to study traps in semiconductors. Nowadays, for traps in Schottky diodes or p-n junctions, DLTS is the standard method to study traps. However, there is an important shortcoming for DLTS: it cannot be used for an insulating material while TSC can be applied to such a situation. (Note: an insulator can be considered as a very large bandgap semiconductor.) In addition, the standard transient capacitance based DLTS method may not be very good for the study of traps in the i-region of a p-i-n diode while the transient current based DLTS (I-DLTS) may be more useful.

TSC has been used to study traps in semi-insulating gallium arsenide (GaAs) substrates. It has also been applied to materials used for particle detectors or semiconductor detectors used in nuclear research, for example, high-resistivity silicon, cadmium telluride (CdTe), etc. TSC has also been applied to various organic insulators. TSC is useful for electret research. More advanced modifications of TSC have been applied to study traps in ultrathin high-κ dielectric thin films. W. S. Lau (Lau Wai Shing, Republic of Singapore) applied zero-bias thermally stimulated current or zero-temperature-gradient zero-bias thermally stimulated current to ultrathin tantalum pentoxide samples. For samples with some shallow traps which can be filled at low temperature and some deep traps which can be filled only at high temperature, a two-scan TSC may be useful as suggested by Lau in 2007. TSC has also been applied to hafnium oxide.

TSC technique is used to study dielectric materials and polymers. Different theories was made to describe the response curve for this technique in order to calculate the peak parameters which are, the activation energy and the relaxation time.
