= Kröger–Vink notation =

Conventions to describe crystals

Kröger–Vink notation is a set of conventions used to describe electric charges and lattice positions of point defect species in crystals. It is primarily used for ionic crystals and is particularly useful for describing various defect reactions. It was proposed by Ferdinand Anne Kröger and Hendrik Jan Vink.

== Notation ==
The notation follows the scheme:

M^{C}_{S}

- M corresponds to the species. These can be
  - atoms – e.g., Si, Ni, O, Cl
  - vacancies – V or v (since V is also the symbol for vanadium)
  - interstitials – i (although this is usually used to describe lattice site, not species)
  - electrons – e
  - electron holes – h
- S indicates the lattice site that the species occupies. For instance, Ni might occupy a Cu site. In this case, M would be replaced by Ni and S would be replaced by Cu. The site may also be a lattice interstice, in this case, the symbol "i" is used. A cation site can be represented by the symbols C or M (for metal), and an anion site can be represented by either an A or X.
- C corresponds to the electronic charge of the species relative to the site that it occupies. The charge of the species is calculated by the charge on the current site minus the charge on the original site. To continue the previous example, Ni often has the same valency as Cu, so the relative charge is zero. To indicate a null charge, × is used. A single • indicates a net single positive charge, while two would represent two net positive charges. Finally, $\prime$ signifies a net single negative charge, so two would indicate a net double negative charge.

=== Examples ===
- Al^{×}_{Al} — an aluminum ion sitting on an aluminum lattice site, with a neutral charge.
- Ni^{×}_{Cu} — a nickel ion sitting on a copper lattice site, with neutral charge.
- v^{•}_{Cl} — a chlorine vacancy, with single positive charge.
- Ca^{••}_{i} — a calcium interstitial ion, with double positive charge.
- Cl^{$\prime$}_{i} — a chlorine anion on an interstitial site, with single negative charge.
- O^{$\prime\prime$}_{i} — an oxygen anion on an interstitial site, with double negative charge.
- e^{$\prime$} — an electron. No site is normally specified.

== Procedure ==
When using Kröger–Vink notation for both intrinsic and extrinsic defects, it is imperative to keep all masses, sites, and charges balanced in each reaction. If any piece is unbalanced, the reactants and the products do not equal the same entit, and therefore all quantities are not conserved as they should be. The first step in this process is determining the correct type of defect and reaction that comes along with it; Schottky and Frenkel defects begin with a null reactant (∅) and produce either cation and anion vacancies (Schottky) or cation/anion vacancies and interstitials (Frenkel). Otherwise, a compound is broken down into its respective cation and anion parts for the process to begin on each lattice. From here, depending on the required steps for the desired outcome, several possibilities occur. For example, the defect may result in an ion on its own ion site or a vacancy on the cation site. To complete the reactions, the proper number of each ion must be present (mass balance), an equal number of sites must exist (site balance), and the sums of the charges of the reactants and products must also be equal (charge balance).

=== Example usage ===
- ∅ ⇌ v^{$\prime\prime\prime\prime$}_{Ti} + 2 v^{••}_{O}
  Schottky defect formation in TiO_{2}.
- ∅ ⇌ v^{$\prime\prime$}_{Ba} + v^{$\prime\prime\prime\prime$}_{Ti} + 3 v^{••}_{O}
  Schottky defect formation in BaTiO_{3}.
- Mg^{×}_{Mg} + O^{×}_{O} ⇌ O^{$\prime\prime$}_{i} + v^{••}_{O} + Mg^{×}_{Mg}
  Frenkel defect formation in MgO.
- Mg^{×}_{Mg} + O^{×}_{O} ⇌ v^{$\prime\prime$}_{Mg} + v^{••}_{O} + Mg^{×}_{surface} + O^{×}_{surface}
  Schottky defect formation in MgO.

== Basic types of defect reactions ==
Assume that the cation C has +1 charge and anion A has −1 charge.

1. Schottky defect – forming a vacancy pair on both anion and cation sites:
  ∅ ⇌ v^{$\prime$}_{C} + v^{•}_{A} ⇌ v^{$\prime$}_{M} + v^{•}_{X}
2. Schottky defect (charged) – forming an electron–hole pair:
  ∅ ⇌ e^{$\prime$} + h^{•}
3. Frenkel defect – forming an interstitial and vacancy pair on an anion or cation site:
  ∅ ⇌ v^{$\prime$}_{C} + C^{•}_{i} ⇌ v^{$\prime$}_{M} + M^{•}_{i} (cationic Frenkel defect)
  ∅ ⇌ v^{•}_{A} + A^{$\prime$}_{i} ⇌ v^{•}_{X} + X^{$\prime$}_{i} (anionic Frenkel defect)
4. Associates – forming an entropically favored site, usually depending on temperature. For the two equations shown below, the right side is usually at high temperature as this allows for more movement of electrons. The left side is usually at low temperature as the electrons lose their mobility due to loss in kinetic energy.
  M^{×}_{M} + e^{$\prime$} → M^{$\prime$}_{M} (metal site reduced)
  B^{×}_{M} → B^{•}_{M} + e^{$\prime$} (metal site oxidized, where B is an arbitrary cation having one more positive charge than the original atom on the site)

== Oxidation–reduction tree ==
The following oxidation–reduction tree for a simple ionic compound, AX, where A is a cation and X is an anion, summarizes the various ways in which intrinsic defects can form. Depending on the cation-to-anion ratio, the species can either be reduced and therefore classified as n-type, or if the converse is true, the ionic species is classified as p-type. Below, the tree is shown for a further explanation of the pathways and results of each breakdown of the substance.

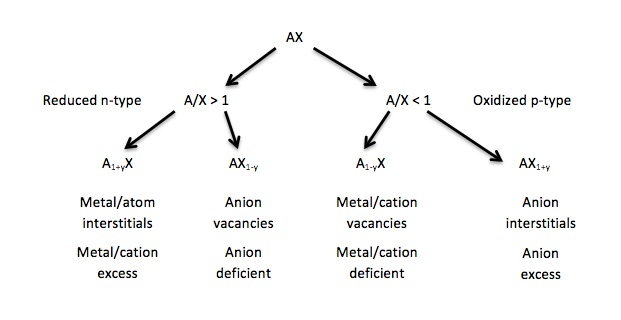
Tree diagram representation of the oxidation and reduction states resulting from intrinsic defects in ionic compounds.

=== Schematic examples ===
From the chart above, there are total of four possible chemical reactions using Kröger–Vink Notation depending on the intrinsic deficiency of atoms within the material. Assume the chemical composition is AX, with A being the cation and X being the anion. (The following assumes that X is a diatomic gas such as oxygen and therefore cation A has a +2 charge. Note that materials with this defect structure are often used in oxygen sensors.)

1. In the reduced n-type, there are excess cations on the interstitial sites:
  A^{×}_{A} + X^{×}_{X} ⇌ A^{••}_{i} + 1/2 X_{2}(g) + 2 e^{$\prime$}
2. In the reduced n-type, there is a deficiency of anions on the lattice sites:
  A(s) ⇌ A^{×}_{A} + v^{••}_{X} + 2 e^{$\prime$}
3. In the oxidized p-type, there is cation deficiency on the lattice sites:
  1/2 X_{2}(g) ⇌ v^{$\prime\prime$}_{A} + X^{×}_{X} + 2 h^{•}
4. In the oxidized p-type, there are excess anions on interstitial sites:
  A^{×}_{A} + X^{×}_{X} ⇌ A(s) + X^{$\prime\prime$}_{i} + 2 h^{•}

== Relating chemical reactions to the equilibrium constant ==
Using the law of mass action, a defect's concentration can be related to its Gibbs free energy of formation, and the energy terms (enthalpy of formation) can be calculated given the defect concentration or vice versa.

=== Examples ===
For a Schottky reaction in MgO, the Kröger–Vink defect reaction can be written as follows:

∅ ⇌ v^{$\prime\prime$}_{Mg} + v^{••}_{O}	1

Note that the vacancy on the Mg sublattice site has a −2 effective charge, and the vacancy on the oxygen sublattice site has a +2 effective charge. Using the law of mass action, the reaction equilibrium constant can be written as (square brackets indicating concentration):

k = [v^{$\prime\prime$}_{Mg}][v^{••}_{O}]	2

Based on the above reaction, the stoichiometric relation is as follows:

[v^{$\prime\prime$}_{Mg}] = [v^{••}_{O}]	3

Also, the equilibrium constant can be related to the Gibbs free energy of formation Δ_{f}G according to the following relations,

k = exp(−Δ_{f}G/k_{B}T), where k_{B} is the Boltzmann constant	4

Δ_{f}G = Δ_{f}H − TΔ_{f}S	5

Relating equations 2 and 4, we get:

exp(−Δ_{f}G/k_{B}T) = [v^{$\prime\prime$}_{Mg}]^{2}

Using equation 5, the formula can be simplified into the following form where the enthalpy of formation can be directly calculated:

[v^{$\prime\prime$}_{Mg}] = exp(−Δ_{f}H/2k_{B}T + Δ_{f}S/2k_{B}) = A exp(−Δ_{f}H/2k_{B}T), where A is a constant containing the entropic term.

Therefore, given a temperature and the formation energy of Schottky defect, the intrinsic Schottky defect concentration can be calculated from the above equation.
