= Off-center ions =

Off-center ions in crystals are substitutional impurity ions whose equilibrium position is shifted away from the regular lattice site. The magnitude of the shift typically ranges from 0.2 to 1.0 Å. There are two possible mechanisms that can cause impurity ion displacement. If the impurity ion is smaller than the regular ion (by 10% or more), the displacement arises because the repulsive forces between the impurity ion and its nearest neighbors stabilize the ion at the regular site are strongly weakened. If the impurity ion is bigger than the regular ion, the displacement arises because of different covalency of the chemical bonds with the nearest neighbors for the impurity and regular ions.

Off-center position of substitutional ions was first discovered in lithium-doped KCl by two groups of American physicists in 1965. Since these pioneer works crystals with off-center impurity ions have attracted continuous attention. The cause of such interest is that these crystals can be used as good model objects for the investigation of such key phenomena in solid state physics as quantum tunnelling of atomic particles in solid state, cooperative properties of the system of local centers with internal degrees of freedom, and ferroelectricity.
