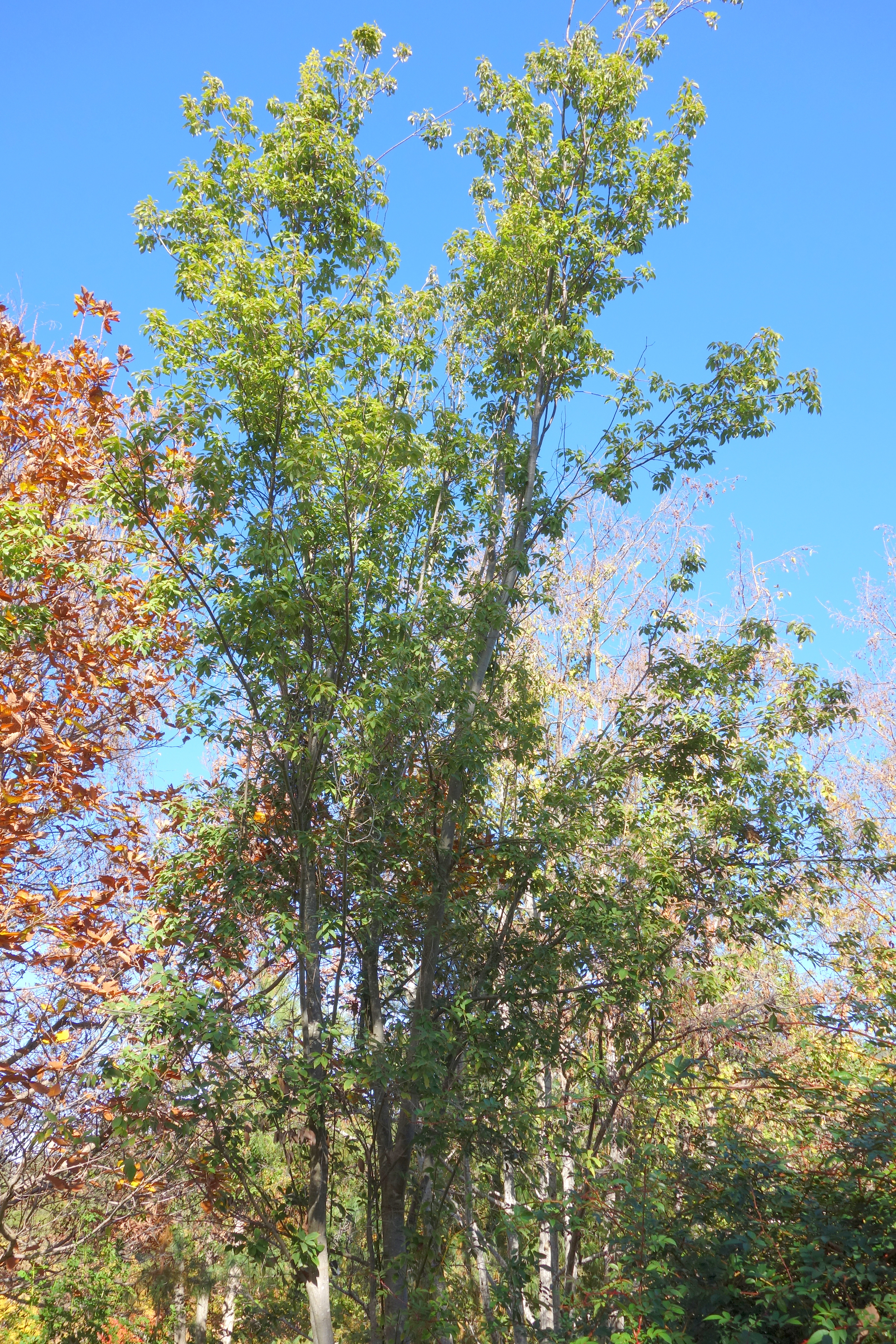

Conservation status
- Least Concern (IUCN 3.1)

Scientific classification
- Kingdom: Plantae
- Clade: Embryophytes
- Clade: Tracheophytes
- Clade: Spermatophytes
- Clade: Angiosperms
- Clade: Eudicots
- Clade: Rosids
- Order: Fagales
- Family: Fagaceae
- Genus: Quercus
- Subgenus: Quercus subg. Cerris
- Section: Quercus sect. Cyclobalanopsis
- Species: Q. schottkyana

Binomial name
- Quercus schottkyana Rehder & E.H.Wilson

Synonyms
- Cyclobalanopsis glaucoides Schottky; Quercus glauca subsp. schottkyana (Rehder & E.H.Wilson) Menitsky

= Quercus schottkyana =

Species of tree

Quercus schottkyana is an Asian species of tree in the beech family Fagaceae. It has been found in southwestern China (Guizhou, Sichuan, Yunnan). It is placed in subgenus Cerris, section Cyclobalanopsis.

Quercus schottkyana is a tree up to 20 meters tall. Twigs are grayish-green. Leaves can be as much as 12 cm long, thick and leathery. A SW Chinese endemic evergreen oak, related to Q. glauca, but with the new foliage densely white hairy and pinky-red, turning green above and glaucous beneath, serrated and with a drawn out tip. A handsome Cyclobalanopsis oak, rare in cultivation
