= Thermally stimulated depolarization current =

Scientific technique for measuring dielectric properties of materials

Thermally stimulated depolarization current (TSDC) is a scientific technique used to measure dielectric properties of materials. It can be used to measure the thermally stimulated depolarization of molecules within a material. One method of doing so is to place the material between two electrodes, cool the material in the presence of an external electric field, remove the field once a desired temperature has been reached, and measure the current between the electrodes as the material warms. The external electric field must be applied at a sufficiently high temperature to allow the molecular dipoles time to align with the field. Because the dielectric relaxation time increases exponentially on cooling, the polarization caused by their alignment with the field gets "frozen-in". So when the field is removed and the material begins to warm the dipoles begin to "thaw" whereby losing their net alignment and thus the material become depolarized. This depolarization can be measured if the material is sandwiched between two ohmic electrodes and the current is measured on warming. As the material depolarizes, charges are pulled to (or pushed away from) the electrodes which causes a current through the measuring device.
