= Frenkel defect =

Crystallographic defect in which atoms are displaced from their spots in the structure

In crystallography, a Frenkel defect is a type of point defect in crystalline solids, named after its discoverer Yakov Frenkel. The defect forms when an atom or smaller ion (usually cation) leaves its place in the structure, creating a vacancy and becomes an interstitial by lodging in a nearby location. In elemental systems, they are primarily generated during particle irradiation, as their formation enthalpy is typically much higher than for other point defects, such as vacancies, and thus their equilibrium concentration according to the Boltzmann distribution is below the detection limit. In ionic crystals, which usually possess low coordination number or a considerable disparity in the sizes of the ions, this defect can be generated also spontaneously, where the smaller ion (usually the cation) is dislocated. Similar to a Schottky defect the Frenkel defect is a stoichiometric defect (does not change the overall stoichiometry of the compound). In ionic compounds, the vacancy and interstitial defect involved are oppositely charged and one might expect them to be located close to each other due to electrostatic attraction. However, this is not likely the case in real material due to smaller entropy of such a coupled defect, or because the two defects might collapse into each other. Also, because such coupled complex defects are stoichiometric, their concentration will be independent of chemical conditions.

== Effect on density ==
Even though Frenkel defects involve only the migration of the ions within the crystal, the total volume and thus the density is not necessarily changed: in particular for close-packed systems, the structural expansion due to the strains induced by the interstitial atom typically dominates over the structural contraction due to the vacancy, leading to a decrease of density.

== Examples ==
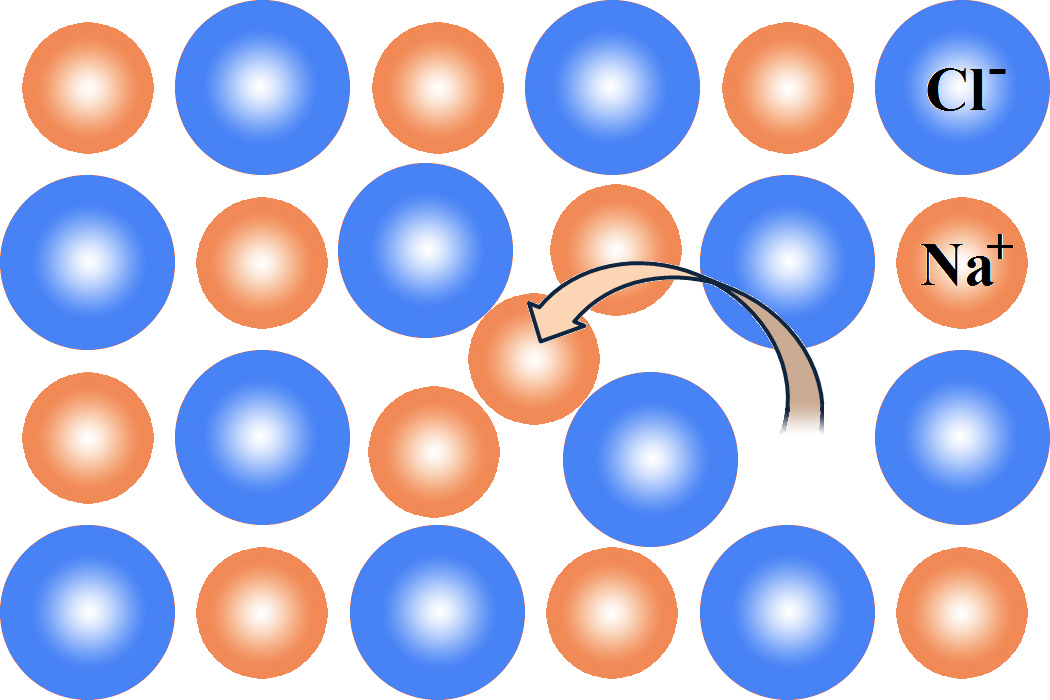
The Frenkel defect within the NaCl structure

Frenkel defects are exhibited in ionic solids with a large size difference between the anion and cation (with the cation usually smaller due to an increased effective nuclear charge)

Some examples of solids which exhibit Frenkel defects:

- zinc sulfide,
- silver(I) chloride,
- silver(I) bromide (also shows Schottky defects),
- silver(I) iodide.

These are due to the comparatively smaller size of $\ce{Zn^2+}$ and $\ce{Ag+}$ ions.

For example, consider a structure formed by X^{n−} and M^{n+} ions. Suppose an M ion leaves the M sublattice, leaving the X sublattice unchanged. The number of interstitials formed will equal the number of vacancies formed.

One form of a Frenkel defect reaction in MgO with the oxide anion leaving the structure and going into the interstitial site written in Kröger–Vink notation:

Mg^{×}_{Mg} + O^{×}_{O} → O^{$\prime\prime$}_{i} + v^{••}_{O} + Mg^{×}_{Mg}

This can be illustrated with the example of the sodium chloride crystal structure. The diagrams below are schematic two-dimensional representations.

The defect-free NaCl structure

Two Frenkel defects within the NaCl structure

== See also ==
- Deep-level transient spectroscopy (DLTS)
- Schottky defect
- Wigner effect
- Crystallographic defect
