= Schottky defect =

Type of point defect in a crystal lattice

A Schottky defect is an excitation of the site occupations in a crystal lattice leading to point defects named after Walter H. Schottky. In ionic crystals, this defect forms when oppositely charged ions leave their lattice sites and become incorporated for instance at the surface, creating oppositely charged vacancies. These vacancies are formed in stoichiometric units, to maintain an overall neutral charge in the ionic solid.

== Definition ==
Schottky defects consist of unoccupied anion and cation sites in a stoichiometric ratio. For a simple ionic crystal of type A^{−}B^{+}, a Schottky defect consists of a single anion vacancy (A) and a single cation vacancy (B), or v^{•}_{A} + v^{$\prime$}_{B} following Kröger–Vink notation. For a more general crystal with formula A_{x}B_{y}, a Schottky cluster is formed of x vacancies of A and y vacancies of B, thus the overall stoichiometry and charge neutrality are conserved. Conceptually, a Schottky defect is generated if the crystal is expanded by one unit cell, whose a prior empty sites are filled by atoms that diffused out of the interior, thus creating vacancies in the crystal.

Schottky defects are observed most frequently when there is a small difference in size between the cations and anions that make up a material.

== Illustration ==
Chemical equations in Kröger–Vink notation for the formation of Schottky defects in TiO_{2} and BaTiO_{3}.

∅ ⇌ v^{$\prime\prime\prime\prime$}_{Ti} + 2 v^{••}_{O}

∅ ⇌ v^{$\prime\prime$}_{Ba} + v^{$\prime\prime\prime\prime$}_{Ti} + 3 v^{••}_{O}

This can be illustrated schematically with a two-dimensional diagram of a sodium chloride crystal lattice:

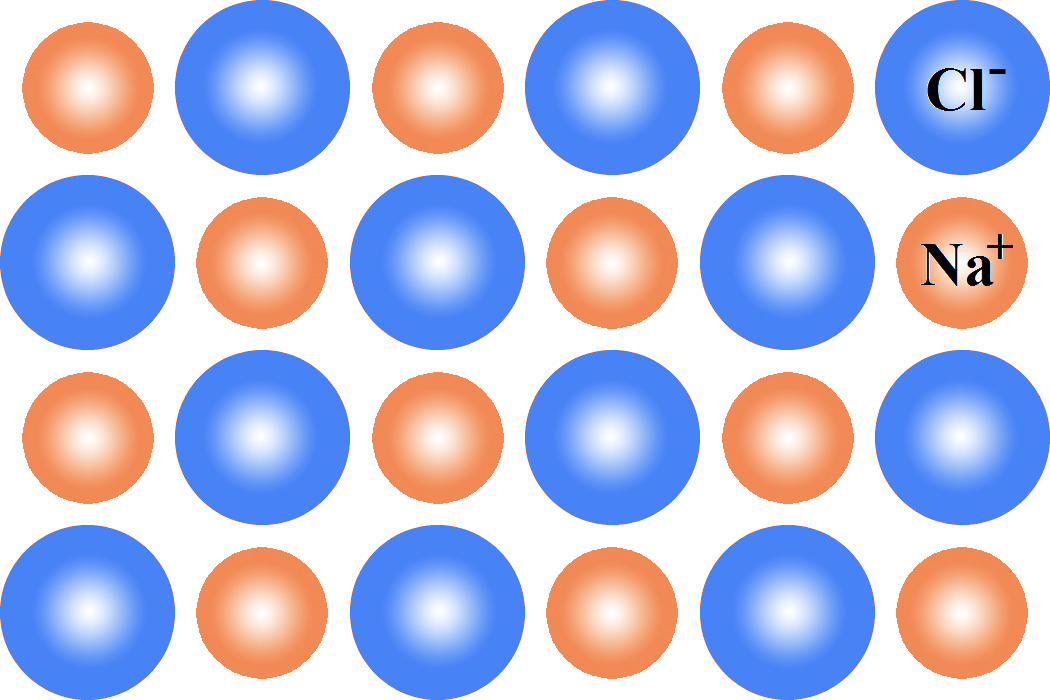
The defect-free NaCl structure

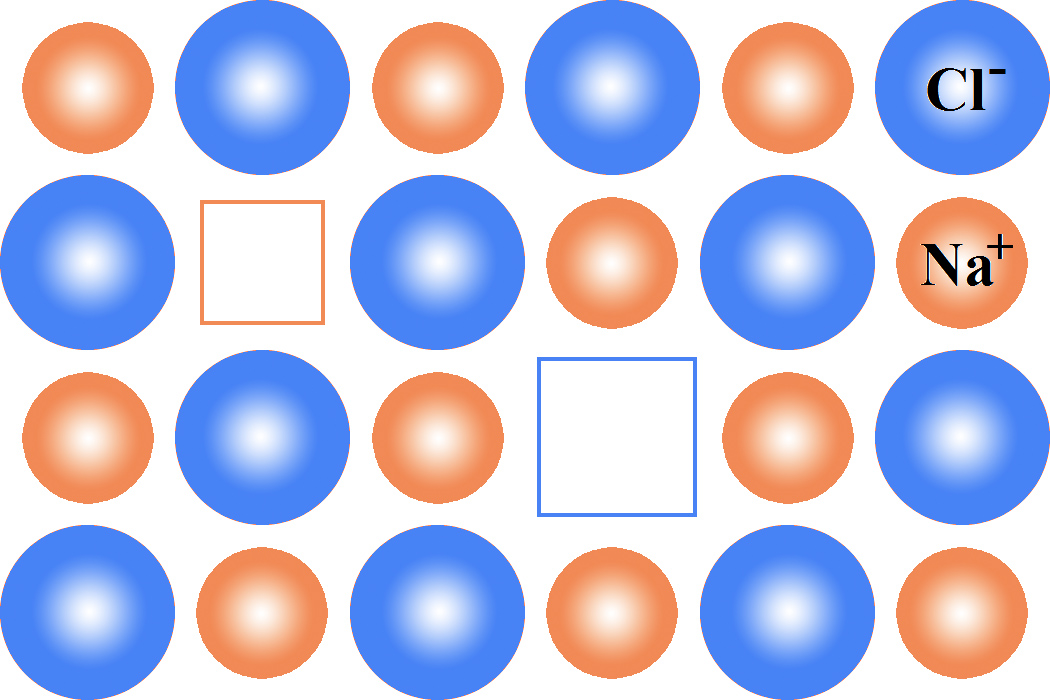
Schottky defects within the NaCl structure

== Bound and dilute defects ==
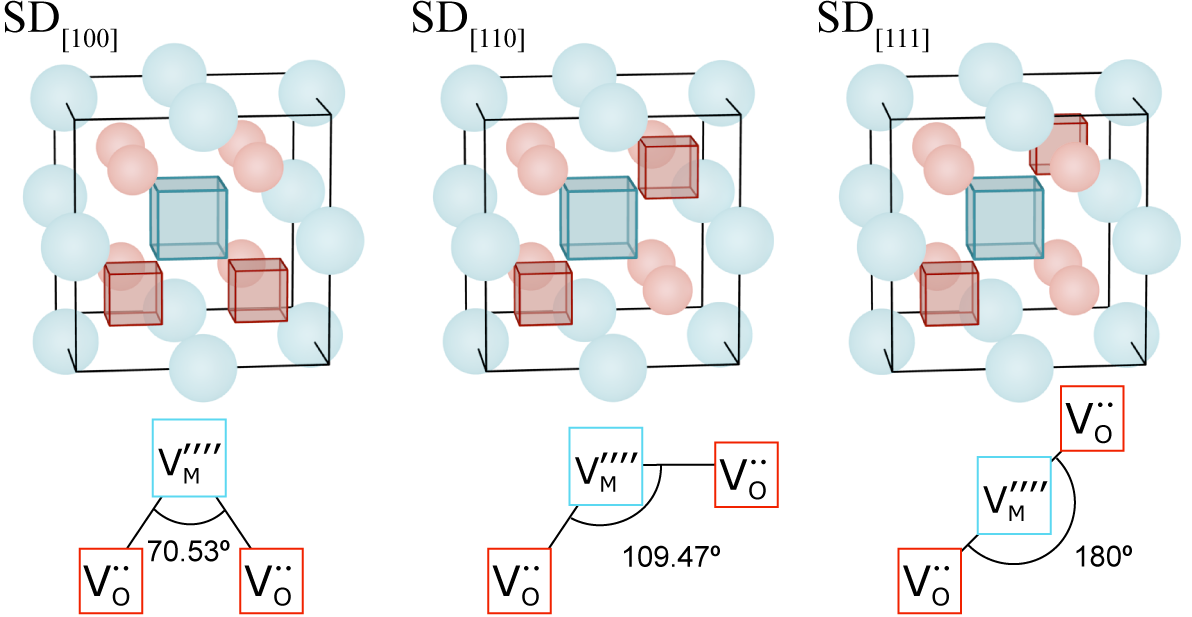
Three bound configurations of Schottky defects in an oxide with Fluorite structure. Spheres represent atoms, cubes represent vacancies.

The vacancies that make up the Schottky defects have opposite charge, thus they experience a mutually attractive Coulomb force. At low temperature, they may form bound clusters. The degree at which the Schottky defect affects the lattice is dependent on temperature where the higher temperatures around a cation vacancy multiple anion vacancies can also be observed. When there are anion vacancies located near a cation vacancy this will hinder the displacement of cation energy.

The bound clusters are typically less mobile than the dilute counterparts, as multiple species need to move in a concerted motion for the whole cluster to migrate. This has important implications for numerous functional ceramics used in a wide range of applications, including ion conductors, Solid oxide fuel cells and nuclear fuel.

== Examples ==
This type of defect is typically observed in highly ionic compounds, highly coordinated compounds, and where there is only a small difference in sizes of cations and anions of which the compound lattice is composed. Typical salts where Schottky disorder is observed are NaCl, KCl, KBr, CsCl and AgBr. For engineering applications, Schottky defects are important in oxides with Fluorite structure, such as CeO_{2}, cubic ZrO_{2}, UO_{2}, ThO_{2} and PuO_{2}.

== Effect on density ==
Typically, the formation volume of a vacancy is positive: the lattice contraction due to the strains around the defect does not make up for the expansion of the crystal due to the additional number of sites. Thus, the density of the solid crystal is less than the theoretical density of the material.

== See also ==
- Frenkel defect
- Wigner effect
- Crystallographic defects
