= Vacancy defect =

Crystallographic defect; an atom missing from a lattice site

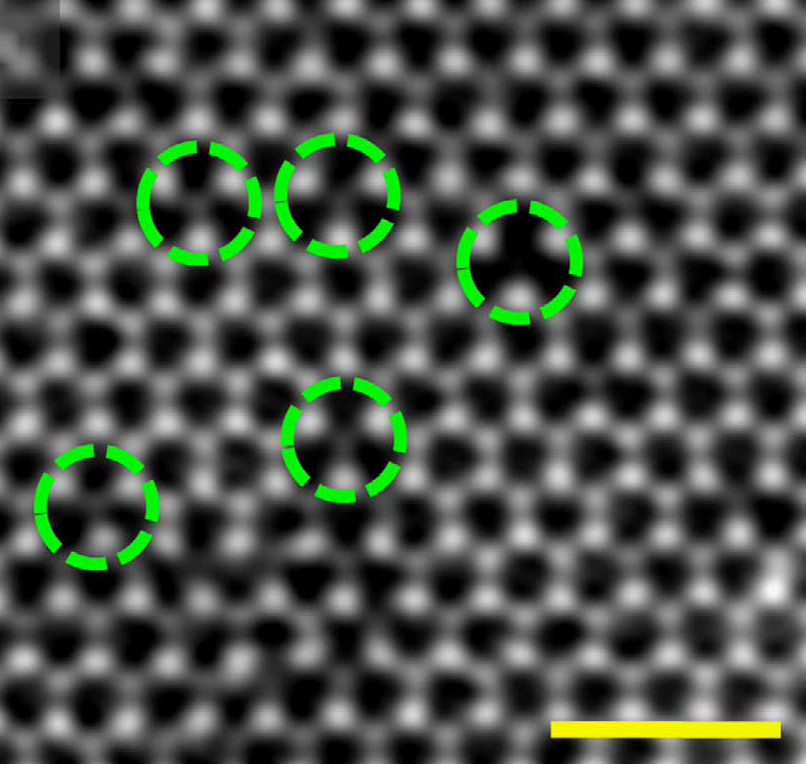
Electron microscopy of sulfur vacancies in a monolayer of molybdenum disulfide. Right circle points to a divacancy, i.e., sulfur atoms are missing both above and below the Mo layer. Other circles are single vacancies, i.e., sulfur atoms are missing only above or below the Mo layer. Scale bar: 1 nm.

In crystallography, a vacancy is a type of point defect in a crystal where an atom is missing from one of the lattice sites. Crystals inherently possess imperfections, sometimes referred to as crystallographic defects.

Vacancies occur naturally in all crystalline materials. At any given temperature, up to the melting point of the material, there is an equilibrium concentration (ratio of vacant lattice sites to those containing atoms). At the melting point of some metals the ratio can be approximately 1:1000. This temperature dependence can be modelled by

$$N_{\rm v} = N \exp\left(\frac{-Q_{\rm v}}{k_{\rm B}T}\right)$$

where N_{v} is the vacancy concentration, Q_{v} is the energy required for vacancy formation, k_{B} is the Boltzmann constant, T is the absolute temperature, and N is the concentration of atomic sites i.e.

$$N = \frac{\rho N_{\rm A}}{M}$$

where ρ is density, N_{A} the Avogadro constant, and M the molar mass.

It is the simplest point defect. In this system, an atom is missing from its regular atomic site. Vacancies are formed during crystallization due to vibration of atoms, local rearrangement of atoms, plastic deformation and ionic bombardments.

The creation of a vacancy can be simply modeled by considering the energy required to break the bonds between an atom inside the crystal and its nearest neighbor atoms. Once that atom is removed from the lattice site, it is put back on the surface of the crystal and some energy is retrieved because new bonds are established with other atoms on the surface. However, there is a net input of energy because there are fewer bonds between surface atoms than between atoms in the interior of the crystal.

== Material physics ==
In most applications vacancy defects are irrelevant to the intended purpose of a material, as they are either too few or spaced throughout a multi-dimensional space in such a way that force or charge can move around the vacancy. In the case of more constrained structures like carbon nanotubes however, vacancies and other crystalline defects can significantly weaken the material.

== Vacancy diffusion ==
Vacancies are essential to atomic diffusion in crystalline solids. Atoms move by hopping into adjacent vacant lattice sites, a process known as vacancy diffusion. This mechanism becomes increasingly important at elevated temperatures, where the equilibrium concentration of vacancies rises exponentially. Vacancy-mediated diffusion governs many processes in materials science, including sintering, creep, and phase transformations. For example, in pure copper at 1000 K, the vacancy concentration is approximately one in 10,000 atoms.

== See also ==
- Crystallographic defect
- Schottky defect
- Frenkel defect
