= Varian Semiconductor =

Electronics company

Varian Semiconductor Equipment Associates, Inc.
- Varian Semiconductor Equipment Associates logo
- Company type: Public
- Traded as: NASDAQ: VSEA
- Industry: Semiconductor Equipment & Materials
- Founded: Incorporated 1999
- Fate: Acquired by Applied Materials
- Headquarters: Gloucester, Massachusetts, United States
- Key people: Gary E. Dickerson, Chief Executive Officer and Director; Robert J. Halliday, CFO
- Revenue: ▲$1.055 Billion USD (2007)
- Operating income: ▲$256 Million USD (2007)
- Net income: ▲$142 Million USD (2007)
- Number of employees: 1,702 (2008)
- Website: www.vsea.com

Varian Semiconductor Equipment Associates, Inc. was a supplier of ion implantation equipment used in the fabrication of semiconductor chips. Varian Semiconductor was founded in 1971 as Extrion Corporation in Peabody, Massachusetts. Extrion later moved to nearby Gloucester, Massachusetts and was bought by Varian Associates in 1975. It was spun off from Varian Associates in 1999.

Applied Materials announced its acquisition of Varian Semiconductor in May 2011.
