= ETEC =

ETEC may refer to:

- Enterotoxigenic Escherichia coli, a bacterium
- Energy Technology Engineering Center, a nuclear engineering complex in California
- Etec Systems, Inc., a technology company
- Escadron de transport, d'entrainement et de calibration, a unit of the French Air Force
- E-TEC II, a car engine
- ETEC Lauro Gomes, an educational facility located in São Bernardo do Campo, SP, Brazil
