= Marcy Zenobi-Wong =

Mechanical and tissue engineer and researcher

- Born: 1963 (age 62–63); United States of America
- Education: Massachusetts Institute of Technology; Stanford University
- Scientific career
- Fields: Tissue Engineering
- Workplaces: ETH Zurich

Marcy Zenobi-Wong is an American engineer and professor of Tissue Engineering and Biofabrication at the Swiss Federal Institute of Technology (ETH Zurich). She is known for her work in the field of Tissue Engineering.

== Education and career ==
Zenobi-Wong completed her undergraduate degree in mechanical engineering at the Massachusetts Institute of Technology, and a graduate degree at Stanford University. She completed her PhD on the role of mechanical forces in skeletal development in 1990. After this, she first worked for a year as a postdoc in the Orthopaedic Research Laboratories, University of Michigan, before moving to the University of Bern as group leader Cartilage Biomechanics in 1992, where she habilitated in 2000. In 2003, she moved to ETH Zürich, first to the Institute for Biomedical Engineering, and later to the Department of Health Sciences and Technology, where she became an associate professor in 2017.

== Work ==
Zenobi-Wong works in the area of tissue engineering, in particular for cartilage regeneration. She develops functional biomaterials which mimic the extracellular matrix. The biofabrication techniques used to develop these materials include electrospinning, casting, two-photon polymerization and bioprinting.

Zenobi-Wong holds four licensed patents in the fields of tissue engineering, tissue engineering techniques, and gene expression assays. She was one of the originators of the MSc Biomedical Engineering program at ETH Zürich, and developed several graduate level courses in tissue engineering and biomedical engineering. Zenobi-Wong currently serves as President of the Swiss Society for Biomaterials and Regenerative Medicine, and as secretary general of the International Society of Biofabrication.
