= Furnace anneal =

Process used to alter the electrical properties of semiconductors

External image
- Anneal furnace, 2018

Furnace annealing is a process used in semiconductor device fabrication which consist of heating multiple semiconductor wafers in order to affect their electrical properties. Heat treatments are designed for different effects. Wafers can be heated in order to activate dopants, change film to film or film to wafer substrate interfaces, densify deposited films, alter states of grown films, repair damage from implants, move dopants or drive dopants from one film into another or from a film into the wafer substrate. During ion implantation process, the crystal substrate is damaged due to bombardment with high energy ions. The damage caused can be repaired by subjecting the crystal to high temperature. This process is called annealing. Furnace anneals may be integrated into other furnace processing steps, such as oxidations, or may be processed on their own.

Furnace anneals are performed by equipment especially built to heat semiconductor wafers. Furnaces are capable of processing many wafers at a time, but each process can last between several hours and a day. Increasingly, furnace anneals are being supplanted by Rapid Thermal Anneal (RTA) or Rapid Thermal Processing (RTP). This is due to the relatively long thermal cycles of furnaces that causes the dopants which are being activated, especially boron, to diffuse further than is intended. RTP or RTA fixes this by having thermal cycles for each wafer that is of the order of minutes rather than hours for furnace anneals.
