= Etec Systems =

Coordinates: 45.5474°N 122.898°W

- Founded: 1970
- Defunct: 2005
- Fate: Purchased by Applied Materials
- Products: scanning electron microscopes laser beam lithography tools

Etec Systems was an American producer of scanning electron microscopes, electron beam lithography tools, and laser beam lithography tools from 1970 until 2005. It was located in Hayward, California, and Hillsboro, Oregon.

== Company history ==
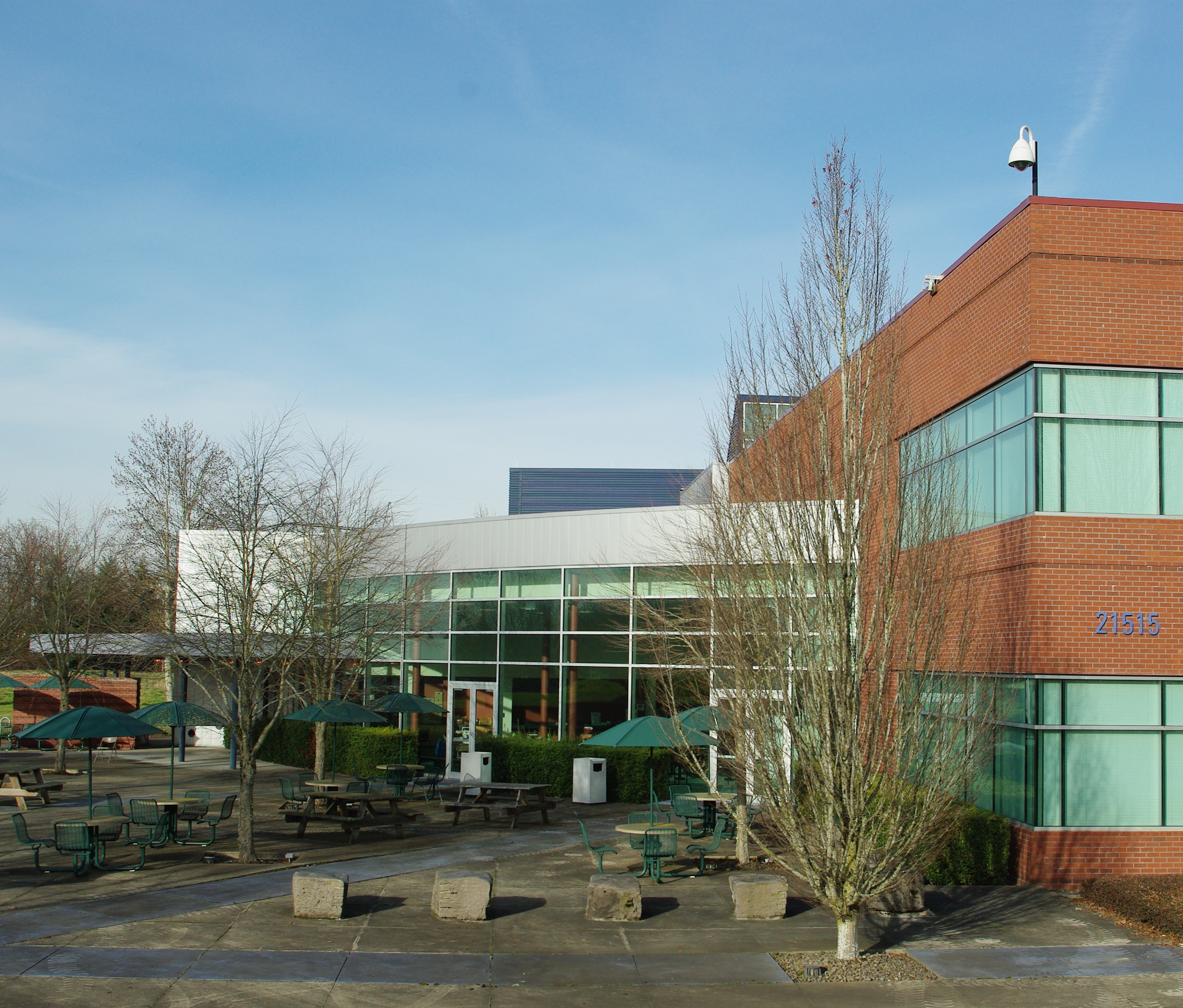
Former Etec building in Hillsboro, Oregon

Etec was purchased by Applied Materials in 2000, and organized within the Applied Materials corporation as an autonomous business group. In 2000, Etec employed 600 workers in Hayward.

In 2002, Applied Materials announced it was reviewing a plan to shut down Etec. Etec Systems was absorbed into its parent company Applied Materials in October 2005.
