= 3D microfabrication =

Three-dimensional (3D) microfabrication refers to manufacturing techniques that involve the layering of materials to produce a three-dimensional structure at a microscopic scale. These structures are usually on the scale of micrometers and are popular in microelectronics and microelectromechanical systems.

== Rapid prototyping ==
Much like their macroscopic analog, microstructures can be produced using rapid prototyping methods. These techniques generally involve the layering of some resin, with each layer being much thinner than that used for conventional processes in order to produce higher resolution microscopic components. Layers in processes such as electrochemical fabrication can be as thin as 5 to 10 μm. The creation of microscopic structures is similar to conventional additive manufacturing techniques in that a computer aided design model is sliced into an appropriate number of two-dimensional layers in order to create a toolpath. This toolpath is then followed by a mechanical system to produce the desired geometry.

A popular application is stereolithography (SLA), which involves the use of a UV light or laser beam on a surface to create a layer, which are then lowered into a tank so that a new layer can be formed on top. Another commonly used method is fused deposition modeling (FDM), in which a moving head creates a layer by melting the model material (usually a polymer) and extrudes the melted material onto a surface. Other methods such as selective laser sintering (SLS) are also used in the additive manufacturing of 3D microstructures.

=== 3D laser microfabrication ===
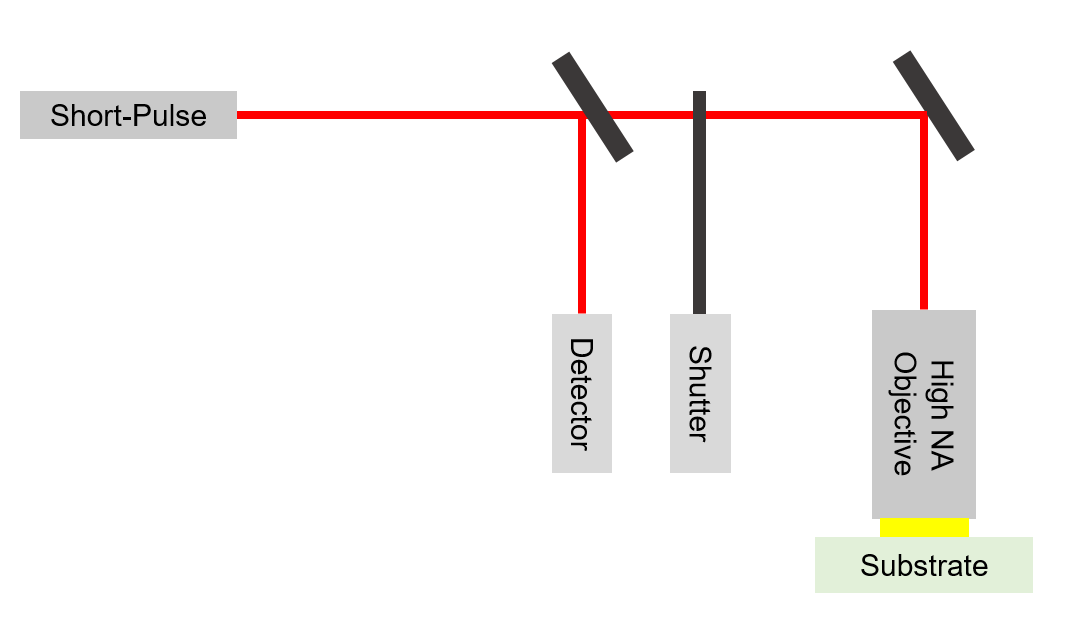
Setup of a typical laser microfabrication

Laser-based techniques are the most common approach for producing microstructures. Typical techniques involve the use of lasers to add or subtract material from a bulk sample. Recent applications of lasers involve the use of ultrashort pulses of lasers focused to a small area in order to create a pattern that is layered to create a structure. The use of lasers in such a manner is known as direct laser writing (DLW) or multiphoton lithography. Microscopic mechanical elements such as micromotors, micropumps, and other microfluidic devices can be produced using direct-write concepts. In addition to additive and subtractive processes, DLW allows for the modification of the properties of a material. Mechanisms that allow for these modifications include sintering, microstereolithography, and multiphoton processes. These use pulsed femtosecond lasers to deliver a precise dosage to induce absorption of energy, leading to an excited state that can result in annealing and surface structuring of a material. The specific changes caused by irradiation depend on parameters such as pulse energy, pulse duration or pulse repetition rate.

==== Microstereolithography ====
Microstereolithography is a common technique based on stereolithography principles. 3D components are fabricated by repeatedly layering photopolymerizable resin and curing under an ultraviolet laser. Earlier systems that employ this technique use a scanning principle in which a focused light beam is fixed onto one location and the translation stage moves to fabricate each layer vector by vector. A faster alternate involves using a projection principle in which the image is projected onto the surface of the resin so that the irradiation of a layer is done in one step only. The high-resolution results allow for the fabrication of complex shapes that would otherwise be difficult to produce at such small scales.

==== Multiphoton lithography ====
Multiphoton lithography, e.g., two-photon polymerization (2PP), can be used to 3D print structures with sub-micrometer resolution. The process uses the focal point of a laser to photopolymerize the resin or glass at a specific point. To achieve high photon currents in the range of 10^{31} photons s^{−1} cm^{−2} femtosecond lasers with pulse widths of 100 fs are used. In 2PP, two photons meet at the focal point, doubling the laser's excitation energy and curing a voxel of 2PP resin while having a minimum effect on the material around the voxel/focal point. By moving the focal point around in three-dimensional space and solidifying the medium at different points, the desired 3D geometry can be additively manufactured with feature size down to 100-160 nm as of 2023. The limits of 2PP fabrication depend on the utilized equipment (servo, mirrors, and laser resolution) and selected lens (laser focusing), as well as the material (UV absorption profile and reactivity). Recently, a list of 2PP printed materials has been actively expanding and includes hard and flexible polymers, glass, soft elastomers, enabling microfabrication of various MEMS and soft microbotics.

==== Other additive processes ====
Additive processes involve the layering of materials in a certain pattern. These include laser chemical vapor deposition (LCVD), which use organic precursors to write patterns on a structure or bulk material. This application can be found in the field of electronics, particularly in the repair of transistor arrays for displays. Another additive process is laser-induced forward transfer (LIFT), which uses pulsed lasers aimed at a coated substrate to transfer material in the direction of the laser flow. LIFT has been used to produce transfer thermo-electric materials, polymers and has been used to print copper wires.

== With Inclined/Rotated UV Lithography ==
Three-dimensional microstructures are used in a range of microsystems, including electronic, mechanical, micro-optical, and analytical systems. Conventional micromachining techniques, such as surface micromachining, bulk micromachining, and LIGA, have limited capability to produce oblique and curved three-dimensional structures. Inclined/rotated UV lithography is an alternative method for fabricating such structures.

=== Fabrication ===
The basic setup of inclined UV exposure has conventional UV source, a contact stage, and a tilting stage. Plus, we place a photomask and a photoresist coated substrate between the upper and lower plates of the contact stage, and it is fixed by pushing up the lower plate with a screw. Then, we can expose the photoresist to the inclined UV.

An example of the fabrication process: SU-8 is a negative thick photoresist, which is used in novel 3D micro fabrication method with inclined/rotated UV lithography. During the process, we coat SU-8 50 on a silicon wafer with a thickness of about 100 μm. Then, soft bake the resist on a 65 °C hot plate for 10 minutes and on a 95 °C plate for 30 minutes. It is contacted with a photomask using the contact stage. This stage, is leaned against the tilting stage and the resist is exposed to the UV. The dose of 365 nm UV is 500mJ/cm^{2}. After the exposure, the resist is post-exposure baked on a 65 °C hot plate for 3 minutes and on a 95 °C plate for 10 minutes. In the end, the resist is developed in the SU-8 for about 10 to 15 minutes at the room temperature with mild agitation and then, rinsed with isopropyl alcohol. Besides that, there can be a lot of other procedures. For example, inclined UV lithography, inclined and rotated UV lithography and lithography using reflected UV.

When the trace of the incident UV with a right angle is on a straight line, so the patterns of a photomask are transcribed to the resist. When talking about inclined UV exposure processes, the UV is refracted and reflected, this makes it possible to fabricate various of 3D structures. The microstructures fabricated by the 3D micro fabrication technology can be allied to a lot of microsystems directly. Also, it can be used as the molds for electroplating. As a result, these technology can be applied to a variety of fields like filters, mixers, jets, micro channels, light guide panels of LCD monitor and more.

== Self-folding materials ==
Design of complicated 3D microstructure can be a challenging task for development of unique or complex parts such as those for optics, biotechnology and micro/nano electronics. 3D materials can be fabricated using multiple different methods, including two-photon photolithography, interference lithography and molding. 3D structuring using these techniques can be complicated, experimentally. This can limit their upscaling and applicability.

Nature offers a large number of ideas for the design of novel materials with superior properties. Self-assembly and self-organization being the main principle of structure formation in nature attract significant interest as promising concepts for the design of intelligent materials.

Stimuli-responsive hydrogels mimic swelling/shrinking behavior of plant cells and produce macroscopic actuation in response to a small variation of environmental conditions. Mostly, homogenous expansion or contraction in all directions can result a change of conditions. Also, inhomogeneous expansion and shrinkage can result more complex behavior like bending, twisting and folding and they can happen with different magnitudes in different directions. Utilization of these phenomena for the design of structured materials can be highly attractive because they allow simple, template-free fabrication of very complex repetitive 2D and 3D patterns. However, they cannot be prepared by using sophisticated fabrication methods like two-photon and interference photolithography as mentioned before. There is an advantage of the self-folding approach, is the possibility of quick, reversible, and reproducible fabrication of 3D hollow objects with controlled chemical properties and morphology of both the exterior and the interior.

One experimental application of self-folding materials is pasta that ships flat but folds into the desired shape on contact with boiling water.

=== Outlook ===
One factor that limit broad applicability of self-folding polymer films is the manufacturing cost. Polymer can be deposited by spinning and dipping coating at ambient conditions, the fabrication of polymer self-folding films is substantially cheaper than fabrication of inorganic ones, which are produced by vacuum deposition. There is no other method, which is cheap and large-scale production of self-folding polymer films that substantially limits their application.

For these issues to be solved, the future research done must be required to focus on deeper investigation of folding to allow design of complex 3D structures using 2D shapes. Researching a way which is cheap, efficient, and fast, and which allows for manufacturing of large quantity of self-folding films will help improve the technology.
