= Rapid thermal processing =

Quickly heats semiconductor wafers to high temperatures

Rapid thermal processing (RTP) is a semiconductor manufacturing process which heats silicon wafers to temperatures exceeding 1,000°C for not more than a few seconds. During cooling wafer temperatures must be brought down slowly to prevent dislocations and wafer breakage due to thermal shock. Such rapid heating rates are often attained by high intensity lamps or lasers. These processes are used for a wide variety of applications in semiconductor manufacturing including dopant activation, thermal oxidation, metal reflow and chemical vapor deposition.

== Temperature control ==
One of the key challenges in rapid thermal processing is accurate measurement and control of the wafer temperature. Monitoring the ambient with a thermocouple has only recently become feasible, in that the high temperature ramp rates prevent the wafer from coming to thermal equilibrium with the process chamber. One temperature control strategy involves in situ pyrometry to effect real time control. Used for melting iron for welding purposes.

== Rapid thermal anneal ==
Rapid thermal anneal (RTA) in rapid thermal processing is a process used in semiconductor device fabrication which involves heating a single wafer at a time in order to affect its electrical properties. Unique heat treatments are designed for different effects. Wafers can be heated in order to activate dopants, change film-to-film or film-to-wafer substrate interfaces, densify deposited films, change states of grown films, repair damage from ion implantation, move dopants or drive dopants from one film into another or from a film into the wafer substrate.

Rapid thermal anneals are performed by equipment that heats a single wafer at a time using either lamp based heating, a hot chuck, or a hot plate that a wafer is brought near. Unlike furnace anneals they are of short duration, processing each wafer in several minutes.

To achieve short annealing times and quick throughput, sacrifices are made in temperature and process uniformity, temperature measurement and control, and wafer stress.

RTP-like processing has found applications in another rapidly growing field: solar cell fabrication. RTP-like processing, in which the semiconductor sample is heated by absorbing optical radiation, has come to be used for many solar cell fabrication steps, including phosphorus diffusion for N/P junction formation and impurity gettering, hydrogen diffusion for impurity and defect passivation, and formation of screen-printed contacts using Ag-ink for the front and Al-ink for back contacts, respectively.

== See also ==
- Tammann temperature and Hüttig temperature
