= Two-photon absorption =

Simultaneous absorption of two photons by a molecule

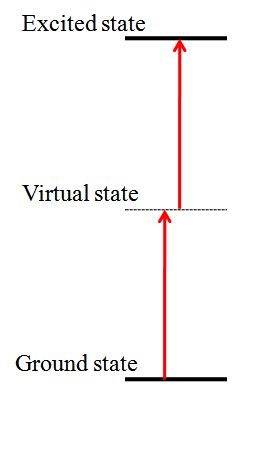
Schematic of energy levels involved in two photons absorption

In atomic physics, two-photon absorption (TPA or 2PA), also called two-photon excitation or non-linear absorption, is the simultaneous absorption of two photons of identical or different frequencies in order to excite an atom or a molecule from one state (usually the ground state), via a virtual energy level, to a higher energy, most commonly an excited electronic state. Absorption of two photons with the same frequency is called degenerate two-photon absorption, while absorption of two photons with different frequencies is called non-degenerate two-photon absorption. The energy difference between the involved lower and upper states is equal or smaller than the sum of the photon energies of the two photons absorbed.

Since TPA depends on the simultaneous absorption of two photons, the probability of two-photon absorption is proportional to the photon dose (D), which is proportional to the square of the light intensity D ∝ I^{2} thus it is a nonlinear optical process. Two-photon absorption is a third-order process, with absorption cross section typically several orders of magnitude smaller than one-photon absorption cross section.

Two-photon absorption was originally predicted by Maria Goeppert-Mayer in 1931 in her doctoral dissertation. Thirty years later, the invention of the laser permitted the first experimental verification of two-photon absorption when two-photon-excited fluorescence was detected in a europium-doped crystal. Soon afterwards, the effect was observed in cesium vapor and then in cadmium sulfide, a semiconductor.

== Description ==
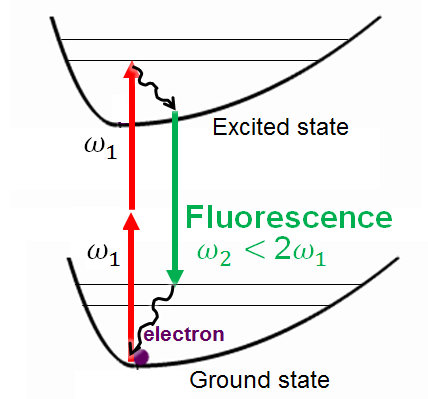
Schematic of energy levels involved in two photons excited fluorescence. First there is a two-photons absorption, followed by one non-radiative deexcitation and a fluorescence emission. The electron returns at ground state by another non-radiative deexcitation. The created pulsation $\omega_2$ is thus smaller than twice the excited pulsation $\omega_1$.

Two-photon absorption is a nonlinear optical process dependent on the third-order nonlinear susceptibility. In general, there is a relationship between the number of photons (order of the electronic transitions) involved in a multi-photon absorption process (2 for TPA), and the order of the corresponding nonlinear susceptibility (3 for TPA). The relationship may be understood using the optical theorem. This theorem relates the imaginary part of an all-optical process of a given perturbation order $m$ with a process involving charge carriers with half the perturbation order, i.e. $m/2$. To apply this theorem it is important to consider that the order in perturbation theory to calculate the probability amplitude of an all-optical $\chi^{(n)}$process is $m=n+1$. Since in the case of two-photon absorption there are electronic transitions of the second order involved ($m/2=2$), it results from the optical theorem that the order of the nonlinear susceptibility is $n=m-1=3$, i.e. it is a $\chi^{(3)}$process.

There are two (quite orthogonal) models that can be used to understand TPA, namely classical optics and quantum mechanics. In the classical picture, third-order optical process are described by the equation $\tilde{P}_i (\omega = \omega_j + \omega_k +\omega_{\ell}) = \tilde{\chi}^{(3)}_{ijk\ell} (\omega_j, \omega_k, \omega_\ell) \tilde{E}_j (\omega_j) \tilde{E}_k (\omega_k) \tilde{E}_\ell (\omega_\ell)$, where $\tilde{P}_i$ is the i-th component of the polarization field, $\tilde{E}_j$, etc. are the j-th, etc. components of the three electric fields involved in a third-order process, and $\tilde{\chi}^{(3)}_{ijk\ell}$ is the fourth-rank susceptibility tensor. The tilde over each of these values denotes that they are, in general, complex. TPA can happen when the imaginary part of the relevant $\tilde{\chi}^{(3)}_{ijk\ell}(\omega) + 1$ component is positive. When this value is negative, the opposite process, two-photon emission, can occur. This follows from the same physics that describes single-photon loss and gain in a medium using the first-order equation $\tilde{P}_i (\omega) = \tilde{\chi}^{(1)}_{ij} (\omega) \tilde{E}_j (\omega)$. Note that this convention of absorption for $\mathcal{Im}[\tilde{\chi}^{(3)}_{ijk\ell} + 1] > 0$ and emission for $\mathcal{Im}[\tilde{\chi}^{(3)}_{ijk\ell} + 1] < 0$ is the one commonly followed in physics; in engineering, the opposite convention is often used.

In the quantum mechanical model, we think of light as photons. In non-resonant two-photon absorption, neither photon is at resonance with the system energy gap, and two photons combine to bridge the energy gap larger than the energies of each photon individually. If there were an intermediate electronic state in the gap, this could happen via two separate one-photon transitions in a process described as "resonant TPA", "sequential TPA", or "1+1 absorption" where the absorption alone is a first order process and the generated fluorescence will rise as the square of the incoming intensity. In non-resonant two-photon absorption the transition occurs without the presence of the intermediate state. This can be viewed as being due to a "virtual state" created by the interaction of the photons with the molecule.

The "nonlinear" in the description of this process means that the strength of the interaction increases faster than linearly with the electric field of the light. In fact, under ideal conditions the rate of two-photon absorption is proportional to the square of the field intensity. This dependence can be derived quantum mechanically, but is intuitively obvious when one considers that it requires two photons to coincide in time and space. This requirement for high light intensity means that lasers are required to study two-photon absorption phenomena. Further, in order to understand the two-photon absorption spectrum, monochromatic light is also desired in order to measure the two-photon absorption cross section at different wavelengths. Hence, tunable pulsed lasers (such as frequency-doubled Nd:YAG-pumped optical parametric oscillators and optical parametric amplifiers) are the choice of excitation.

In a semiconductor, TPA is impossible if two photons cannot bridge the band gap. So, many materials can be used for the Kerr effect that do not show any one- or two-photon absorption and thus have a high damage threshold.

=== Selection Rules ===
The selection rules for two-photon absorption are different from one-photon absorption (OPA), which is dependent on the first-order susceptibility. The relationship between the selection rules for one- and two-photon absorption is analogous to those of Raman and IR spectroscopies. For example, in a centrosymmetric molecule, one- and two-photon allowed transitions are mutually exclusive; an optical transition allowed in one of the spectroscopies is forbidden in the other, although symmetry-breaking interactions and vibrational-electronic (vibronic) coupling can also enable absorption. However, for non-centrosymmetric molecules there is no formal mutual exclusion between the selection rules for one-photon absorption and two-photon absorption. In quantum mechanical terms, this difference results from the fact that the quantum states of such molecules have either + or - inversion symmetry, usually labelled by g (for +) and u (for −). One photon transitions are only allowed between states that differ in the inversion symmetry, i.e. $g \leftrightarrow u$, while two photon transitions are only allowed between states that have the same inversion symmetry, i.e. $g \leftrightarrow g$ and $u \leftrightarrow u$.

Below are a series of tables outlining the electric-dipole selection rules for two-photon absorption in a bulk material. $F$ is the total angular momentum of the state and $M$ is the $\hat{z}$ projection of $F$. For the polarization-specific rules, $\pi$ means light linearly polarized along $\hat{z}$, $\sigma$ means light linearly polarized orthogonal to $\hat{z}$, and $\sigma^{+,-}$ means left- and right-circularly polarized light, respectively.

General selection rules
Degenerate and non-degenerate TPA	Degenerate TPA only
$|\Delta F| = |F_f - F_i| \leq 2$	$\Delta F : 0 \leftrightarrow 1$ is forbidden
same parity, i.e., $(-1)^{\ell_f} = (-1)^{\ell_i}$	If $|\Delta F| = 1$, then $\Delta M: 0\to 0$ is forbidden
$F_f + F_i =$ integer	

Polarization-specific selection rules
Photon 1 polarization	Photon 2 polarization	Forbidden transitions
$\sigma^+$	$\sigma^-$	$\Delta M \neq 0$
$\sigma^+$	$\pi$	$\Delta F : 0\to 0$ $\Delta M \neq -1$
$\sigma^-$	$\pi$	$\Delta F : 0\to 0$ $\Delta M \neq 1$
$\pi$	$\sigma$	$\Delta F : 0\to 0$ $\Delta M \neq \pm 1$
$\pi$	$\pi$	$\Delta F : 0 \leftrightarrow 1$ $\Delta M \neq 0$
$\sigma^+$	$\sigma^+$	$\Delta F : 0 \leftrightarrow 1, 0 \to 0, \frac{1}{2} \to \frac{1}{2}$ $\Delta M \neq -2$
$\sigma^-$	$\sigma^-$	$\Delta F : 0 \leftrightarrow 1, 0 \to 0, \frac{1}{2} \to \frac{1}{2}$ $\Delta M \neq 2$

The polarization-dependence of the TPA selection rules has distinct effects on TPA spectra in semiconductor quantum wells (QWs). Light polarized in the plane of the well (i.e., TE-polarized) can excite transitions from the light-hole (LH) or the heavy-hole (HH) band. However, light polarized normal to the plane of the QW (i.e., TM-polarized) can only excite transitions from the light-hole band.

This follows directly from the $\Delta M$ selection rule in the table above. In solid-state physics, the LH and HH bands arise from the two different $|m_j|$ values the valence electrons can take, with HH having $m_j = \pm 3/2$ and LH having $m_j = \pm 1/2$. In the conduction band (CB), we assume all electrons are in s-like states, with $\ell = 0$ (and therefore, with $m_j = \pm 1/2$). From the table above, under TM polarization (π-π polarization in the table), one of the selection rules is $\Delta m_j = 0$ ($\Delta M = 0$ in the table). Thus, TM polarized light cannot excite HH-CB transitions. On the other hand, TE polarized light (σ-σ in the notation of the table above) has no such restriction on $\Delta m_j$. Thus, both HH-CB and LH-CB transitions can be cause by TE-polarized light.

== Measurements ==
Two-photon absorption can be measured by several techniques. Some of them are two-photon excited fluorescence (TPEF), z-scan, self-diffraction or nonlinear transmission (NLT). Pulsed lasers are most often used because two-photon absorption is a third-order nonlinear optical process, and therefore is most efficient at very high intensities. However, since the incidence of two-photons classically scales as the square of intensity, quantifying two photon absorption requires measurement of pulse characteristics, or comparison to established references.

=== Absorption rate ===
Beer's law describes the decay in intensity due to one-photon absorption:

$$I(x) = I_0 \mathrm e^{-\alpha \,x} \,$$

where $x$ are the distance that light travelled through a sample, $I(x)$ is the light intensity after travelling a distance $x$, $I(0)$ is the light intensity where the light enters the sample and $\alpha$ is the one-photon absorption coefficient of the sample. In two-photon absorption, for an incident plane wave of radiation, the light intensity versus distance changes to

$$I(x) = \frac{I_0}{1 + \beta x I_0} \,$$

for two-photon absorption with light intensity as a function of path length or cross section $x$ as a function of concentration $c$ and the initial light intensity $I_0$. The absorption coefficient $\alpha$ now becomes the TPA coefficient $\beta$. (Note that there is some confusion over the term $\beta$ in nonlinear optics, since it is sometimes used to describe the second-order polarizability, and occasionally for the molecular two-photon cross-section. More often however, it is used to describe the bulk 2-photon optical density of a sample. The letter $\delta$ or $\sigma$ is more often used to denote the molecular two-photon cross-section.)

=== Two-photon excited fluorescence ===
Two-photon excitation of a fluorophore (a fluorescent molecule) leads to two-photon-excited fluorescence where the excited state produced by two-photon absorption decays by spontaneous emission of a photon to a lower energy state.

Relation between the two-photon excited fluorescence and the total number of absorbed photons per unit time $N_{abs}$ is given by

$$F(t)=\frac{1}{2}\phi\eta N_{\rm abs},$$

where $\phi$ and $\eta$ are the fluorescence quantum efficiency of the fluorophore and the fluorescence collection efficiency of the measurement system, respectively. In a particular measurement, $N_{\rm abs}$ is a function of fluorophore concentration $C$, illuminated sample volume $V$, incident light intensity $I$, and two-photon absorption cross-section $\delta$:

$$N_{\rm abs}=\int_V \mathrm dV \delta C(r,t)I^2(r,t).$$

Notice that the $N_{\rm abs}$ is proportional to the square of the incident light as expected for two-photon absorption.

=== Units of cross-section ===
The molecular two-photon absorption cross-section is usually quoted in the units of Goeppert-Mayer (GM) (after its discoverer, Physics Nobel laureate Maria Goeppert-Mayer), where

1 GM = 10^{−50} cm^{4} s photon^{−1}.

Considering the reason for these units, one can see that it results from the product of two areas (one for each photon, each in cm^{2}) and a time (within which the two photons must arrive to be able to act together). The large scaling factor is introduced in order that 2-photon absorption cross-sections of common dyes will have convenient values.

== Development of the field and potential applications ==
Until the early 1980s, two-photon absorption was used as a spectroscopic tool. Scientists compared the one-photon absorption and two-photon absorption spectra of different organic molecules and obtained several fundamental structure property relationships. However, in late 1980s, applications started to be developed. Peter Rentzepis suggested applications in 3D optical data storage. Watt Webb suggested microscopy and imaging. Other applications such as 3D microfabrication, optical logic, autocorrelation, pulse reshaping and optical power limiting were also demonstrated.

=== 3D imaging of semiconductors ===
It was demonstrated that by using 2-photon absorption charge carriers can be generated spatially confined in a semiconductor device. This can be used to investigate the charge transport properties of such device.

=== Microfabrication and lithography ===
In 1992, with the use of higher laser powers (35 mW) and more sensitive resins/resists, two-photon absorption found its way into lithography. One of the most distinguishing features of two-photon absorption is that the rate of absorption of light by a molecule depends on the square of the light's intensity. This is different from one-photon absorption, where the rate of absorption is linear with respect to input intensity. As a result of this dependence, if material is cut with a high power laser beam, the rate of material removal decreases very sharply from the center of the beam to its periphery. Because of this, the "pit" created is sharper and better resolved than if the same size pit were created using normal absorption.

=== 3D photopolymerization ===
In 1997, Maruo et al. developed the first application of two-photon absorption in 3D microfabrication. In 3D microfabrication, a block of gel containing monomers and a 2-photon active photoinitiator is prepared as a raw material. Application of a focused laser to the block results in polymerization only at the focal spot of the laser, where the intensity of the absorbed light is highest. The shape of an object can therefore be traced out by the laser, and then the excess gel can be washed away to leave the traced solid. Photopolymerization for 3D microfabrication is used in a wide variety of applications, including microoptics, microfluids, biomedical implants, 3D scaffolds for cell cultures and tissue engineering.

=== Imaging ===
The human body is not transparent to visible wavelengths. Hence, one photon imaging using fluorescent dyes is not very efficient. If the same dye had good two-photon absorption, then the corresponding excitation would occur at approximately two times the wavelength at which one-photon excitation would have occurred. As a result, it is possible to use excitation in the far infrared region where the human body shows good transparency.

It is sometimes said, incorrectly, that Rayleigh scattering is relevant to imaging techniques such as two-photon. According to Rayleigh's scattering law, the amount of scattering is proportional to $1/\lambda^4$, where $\lambda$ is the wavelength. As a result, if the wavelength is increased by a factor of 2, the Rayleigh scattering is reduced by a factor of 16. However, Rayleigh scattering only takes place when scattering particles are much smaller than the wavelength of light (the sky is blue because air molecules scatter blue light much more than red light). When particles are larger, scattering increases approximately linearly with wavelength: hence clouds are white since they contain water droplets. This form of scatter is known as Mie scattering and is what occurs in biological tissues. So, although longer wavelengths do scatter less in biological tissues, the difference is not as dramatic as Rayleigh's law would predict.

=== Optical power limiting ===
Another area of research is optical power limiting. In a material with a strong nonlinear effect, the absorption of light increases with intensity such that beyond a certain input intensity the output intensity approaches a constant value. Such a material can be used to limit the amount of optical power entering a system. This can be used to protect expensive or sensitive equipment such as sensors, can be used in protective goggles, or can be used to control noise in laser beams.

=== Photodynamic therapy ===
Photodynamic therapy (PDT) is a method for treating cancer. In this technique, an organic molecule with a good triplet quantum yield is excited so that the triplet state of this molecule interacts with oxygen. The ground state of oxygen has triplet character. This leads to triplet-triplet annihilation, which gives rise to singlet oxygen, which in turn attacks cancerous cells. However, using TPA materials, the window for excitation can be extended into the infrared region, thereby making the process more viable to be used on the human body.

=== Two-photon pharmacology ===
Photoisomerization of azobenzene-based pharmacological ligands by 2-photon absorption has been described for use in photopharmacology. It allows controlling the activity of endogenous proteins in intact tissue with pharmacological selectivity in three dimensions. It can be used to study neural circuits and to develop drug-based non invasive phototherapies.

=== Optical data storage ===
The ability of two-photon excitation to address molecules deep within a sample without affecting other areas makes it possible to store and retrieve information in the volume of a substance rather than only on a surface as is done on the DVD. Therefore, 3D optical data storage has the possibility to provide media that contain terabyte-level data capacities on a single disc.

== Compounds ==
To some extent, linear and 2-photon absorption strengths are linked. Therefore, the first compounds to be studied (and many that are still studied and used in e.g. 2-photon microscopy) were standard dyes. In particular, laser dyes were used, since these have good photostability characteristics. However, these dyes tend to have 2-photon cross-sections of the order of 0.1–10 GM, much less than is required to allow simple experiments.

It was not until the 1990s that rational design principles for the construction of two-photon-absorbing molecules began to be developed, in response to a need from imaging and data storage technologies, and aided by the rapid increases in computer power that allowed quantum calculations to be made. The accurate quantum mechanical analysis of two-photon absorbance is orders of magnitude more computationally intensive than that of one-photon absorbance, requiring highly correlated calculations at very high levels of theory.

The most important features of strongly two-photon absorption molecules were found to be a long conjugation system (analogous to a large antenna) and substitution by strong donor and acceptor groups (which can be thought of as inducing nonlinearity in the system and increasing the potential for charge-transfer). Therefore, many push-pull olefins exhibit high TPA transitions, up to several thousand GM. It is also found that compounds with a real intermediate energy level close to the "virtual" energy level can have large 2-photon cross-sections as a result of resonance enhancement. There are several databases of two-photon absorption spectra available online.

Compounds with interesting two-photon absorption properties also include various porphyrin derivatives, conjugated polymers and even dendrimers. In one study a diradical resonance contribution for the compound depicted below was also linked to efficient two-photon absorption. The two-photon absorption wavelength for this compound is 1425 nanometer with observed two-photon absorption cross section of 424 GM.

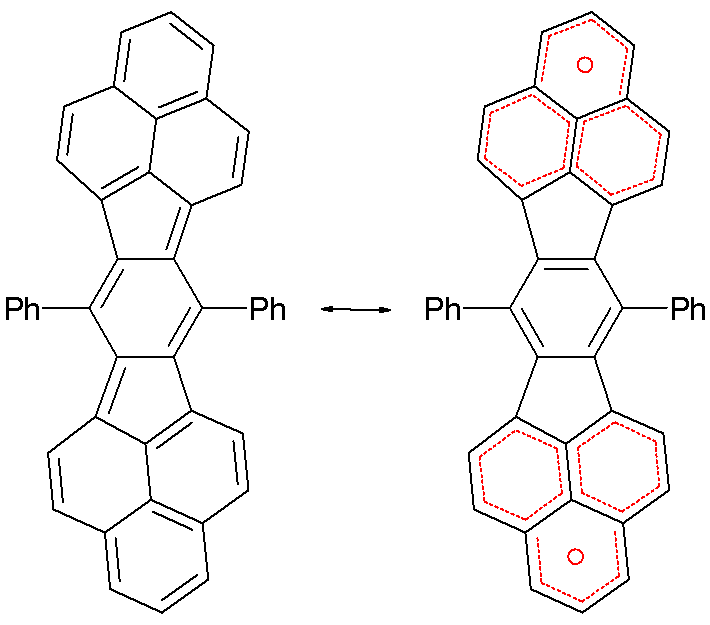

== Coefficients ==
The two-photon absorption coefficient is defined by the relation

$-\frac{dI}{dz}=\alpha I+\beta I^{2}$

so that

$\beta (\omega)=\frac{2 \hbar \omega}{I^{2}} W_T^{(2)}(\omega)=\frac{N}{E}\sigma^{(2)}$

Where $\beta$ is the two-photon absorption coefficient, $\alpha$ is the absorption coefficient, $W_T^{(2)}(\omega)$ is the transition rate for two-photon absorption per unit volume, $I$ is the irradiance, ħ is the reduced Planck constant, $\omega$ is the photon frequency and the thickness of the slice is $dz$. $N$ is the number density of molecules per cm^{3}, $E$ is the photon energy (J), $\sigma^{(2)}$ is the two-photon absorption cross section (cm^{4}s/molecule).

The SI units of the beta coefficient are m/W. If $\beta$ (m/W) is multiplied by 10^{−9} it can be converted to the CGS system (cal/cm s/erg).

Due to different laser pulses the TPA coefficients reported has differed as much as a factor 3. With the transition towards shorter laser pulses, from picosecond to subpicosecond durations, noticeably reduced TPA coefficient have been obtained.

=== In water ===
Laser induced two-photon absorption in water was discovered in 1980.

Water absorbs UV radiation near 125 nm exiting the 3a1 orbital leading to dissociation into OH^{−} and H^{+}. Through two-photon absorption, this dissociation can be achieved by two photons near 266 nm. Since water and heavy water have different vibration frequencies and inertia they also need different photon energies to achieve dissociation and have different absorption coefficients for a given photon wavelength. A study from Jan 2002 used a femtosecond laser tuned to 0.22 Picoseconds found the coefficient of D_{2}O to be 42±5 10^{−11}(cm/W) whereas H_{2}O was 49±5 10^{−11}(cm/W).

TPA coefficients for water
λ (nm)	pulse duration τ (ps)	$\beta\times 10^{11}$ (cm/W)
315	29	4
300	29	4.5
289	29	6
282	29	7
282	0.18	19
266	29	10
264	0.22	49±5
216	15	20
213	26	32

== Two-photon emission ==
The opposite process of two-photon absorption is two-photon emission (TPE), which is a single electron transition accompanied by the emission of a photon pair. The energy of each individual photon of the pair is not determined, while the pair as a whole conserves the transition energy. The spectrum of two-photon emission is therefore very broad and continuous. Two-photon emission is important for applications in astrophysics, contributing to the continuum radiation from planetary nebulae (theoretically predicted for them in and observed in). Two-photon emission in condensed matter and specifically in semiconductors was only first observed in 2008, with emission rates nearly 5 orders of magnitude weaker than one-photon spontaneous emission, with potential applications in quantum information.

== See also ==
- Two-photon circular dichroism
- Two-photon excitation microscopy
