= Z-scan technique =

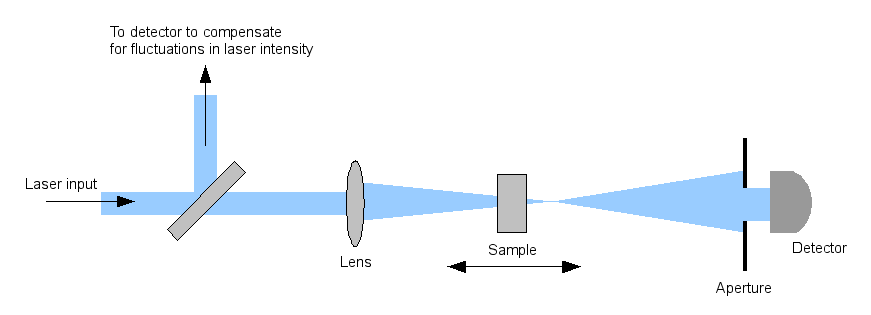
Schematic of a z-scan setup

In nonlinear optics z-scan technique is used to measure the non-linear index n_{2} (Kerr nonlinearity) and the non-linear absorption coefficient Δα via the "closed" and "open" methods, respectively. As nonlinear absorption can affect the measurement of the non-linear index, the open method is typically used in conjunction with the closed method to correct the calculated value. For measuring the real part of the nonlinear refractive index, the z-scan setup is used in its closed-aperture form. In this form, since the nonlinear material reacts like a weak z-dependent lens, the far-field aperture makes it possible to detect the small beam distortions in the original beam. Since the focusing power of this weak nonlinear lens depends on the nonlinear refractive index, it would be possible to extract its value by analyzing the z-dependent data acquired by the detector and by cautiously interpreting them using an appropriate theory. To measure the imaginary part of the nonlinear refractive index, or the nonlinear absorption coefficient, the z-scan setup is used in its open-aperture form. In open-aperture measurements, the far-field aperture is removed and the whole signal is measured by the detector. By measuring the whole signal, the beam small distortions become insignificant and the z-dependent signal variation is due to the nonlinear absorption entirely. Despite its simplicity, in many cases, the original z-scan theory is not completely accurate, e.g. when the investigated sample has inhomogeneous optical nonlinear properties, or when the nonlinear medium response to laser radiation is nonlocal in space. Whenever the laser induced nonlinear response at a certain point of the medium is not solely determined by the laser intensity at that point, but also depends on the laser intensity in the surrounding regions, it will be called a nonlocal nonlinear optical response. Generally, a variety of mechanisms may contribute to the nonlinearity, some of which may be nonlocal. For instance, when the nonlinear medium is dispersed inside a dielectric solution, reorientation of the dipoles (permanent or induced molecular dipoles) as a result of the optical field action is nonlocal in space and changes the electric field experienced by the nonlinear medium. The nonlocal z-scan theory, can be used for systematically analyzing the role of various mechanisms in producing the nonlocal nonlinear response of different materials.

== Closed-aperture z-scan technique ==
In this setup an aperture is placed to prevent some of the light from reaching the detector. The equipment is arranged as can be seen in the diagram. A lens focuses a laser to a certain point, and after this point the beam naturally defocuses. After a further distance an aperture is placed with a detector behind it. The aperture causes only the central region of the cone of light to reach the detector. Typically values of the normalized transmittance are between $0.1<S<0.5$.

The detector is now sensitive to any focusing or defocusing that a sample may induce. The sample is typically placed at the focus point of the lens, and then moved along the z-axis a distance of $\pm z_{0}$ which is given by the Rayleigh length $z_{0}$:

$z_{0}=\frac{\pi W_{0}^{2}}{\lambda}$

The thin sample approximation states that the thickness of the sample $L$ must be less than the Rayleigh length $L<z_{0}$

== Open-aperture z-scan technique ==
This method is similar to the above method, however, the aperture is removed or enlarged to allow all the light to reach the detector. This in effect sets the normalized transmittance to S = 1. This is used in order to measure the non-linear absorption coefficient Δα. The main cause of non-linear absorption is due to two-photon absorption.

== Dual-arm z-scan technique ==
When measuring the nonlinear properties of molecules in solution, the two-photon absorption of the solvent is usually small and determination of $\alpha_{2}$ for the solute is not problematic. However, this is not the case for nonlinear refraction (NLR). Typically, the NLR per molecule of the solvent is much less than that of the solute, but the large density of solvent molecules yields a large net NLR that may dominate the signal due to the solute. Additionally, there is a contribution to the measured $n_{2}$ due to the cells used to hold the samples. In cases where the $n_{2}$ of the solute is small, large discrepancies can arise when reporting the nonlinearity of the solute since the NLR of the solvent and cells must be subtracted from that of the solution. Thus, the determination of solute nonlinearities in regions where the NLR is similar to or much smaller than the solvent or cells has been difficult. Similarly, this problem occurs for thin-films deposited on a substrate, where both film and substrate exhibit two-photon absorption and nonlinear refraction. Dual-arm Z-scan is a modified version of the conventional Z-scan that can address this issue by simultaneously measuring and subtracting the effect of the solvent (or substrate) from the sample under study.

== Eclipsing z-scan ==
This method is similar to the closed z-scan method, however the sensitivity of the system is increased by only looking at the outer edges of the beam by blocking out the central region. This is achieved by replacing the aperture with disks that block the central part of the beam. The method got its name from the way in which the light passes around the disk to the detector in a similar way to an eclipse.

A further improvement to the eclipsing z-scan method is to add a lens behind the aperture so that the light is focused onto the detector, this can also reduce the need for a larger detector.
