= Non-degenerate two-photon absorption =

Simultaneous absorption of two photons of differing energies by a molecule

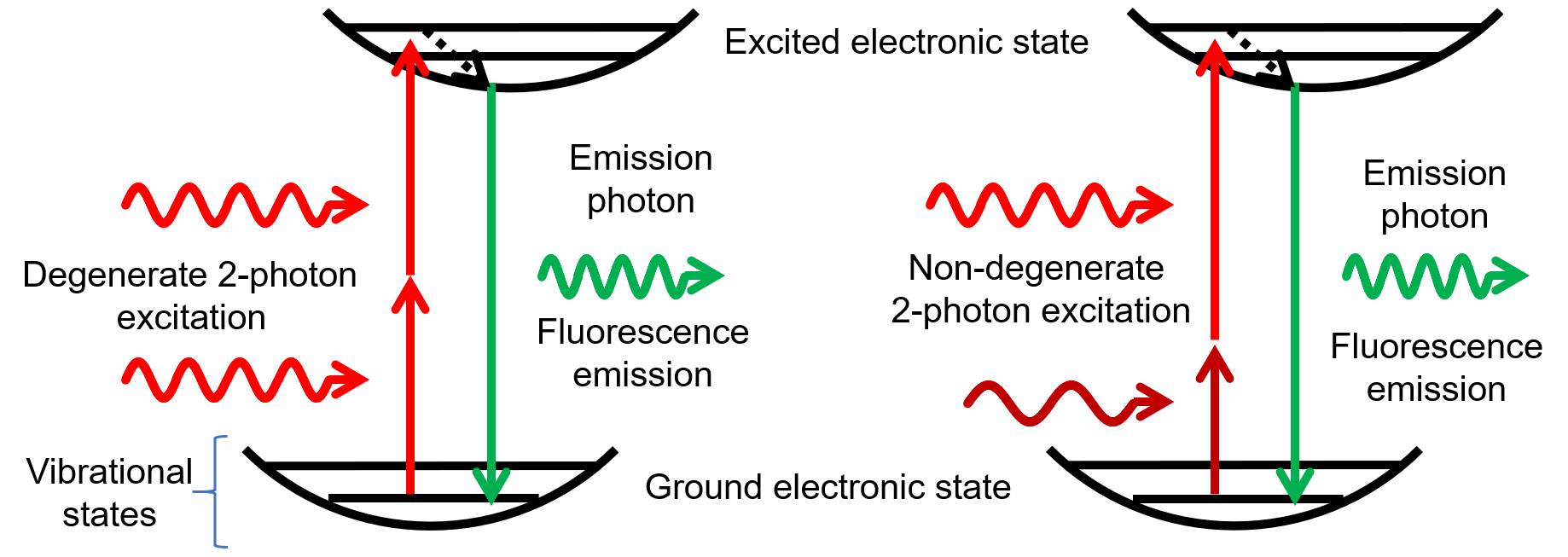
Figure 1.1 Degenerate two-photon excitation of a molecule happens via absorption of two photons with equal energy. In non-degenerate two-photon excitation, two photons with different energies supply the required excitation energy. In both excitation methods, the excited molecule relaxes back to the ground state via fluorescence emission.

In atomic physics, non-degenerate two-photon absorption (ND-TPA or ND-2PA) or two-color two-photon excitation is a type of two-photon absorption (TPA) where two photons with different energies are (almost) simultaneously absorbed by a molecule, promoting a molecular electronic transition from a lower energy state to a higher energy state. The sum of the energies of the two photons is equal to, or larger than, the total energy of the transition.

The probability of ND-TPA is quantified as the non-degenerate two-photon absorption cross section (ND-TPACS) and is an inherent property of molecules. ND-TPACS has been measured using Z-scan (pump-probe) techniques, which measure the laser intensity decrease due to absorption, and fluorescence-based techniques, which measure the fluorescence generated by the fluorophores upon ND-TPA.

In ND-TPA, by absorbing the first photon, the molecule makes a transition to a virtual state and stays in the virtual state for an extremely short period of time (virtual state lifetime, VSL). If a second photon is absorbed during the VSL, the molecule makes a transition to the excited electronic state, otherwise it will relax back to the ground state. Therefore, the two photons are "almost" simultaneously absorbed in two-photon absorption. Based on the time–energy uncertainty relation, VSL is inversely proportional to the energy difference between the virtual state and the nearest real electronic state (i.e. the ground or a nearby excited state). Therefore, the closer the virtual state to the real state, the longer the VSL and the higher the probability of TPA. This means that in comparison to degenerate TPA, where the virtual state is in the middle of the ground and the excited state, ND-TPA has a larger absorption cross-section. This phenomenon is known as the resonance enhancement and is the main mechanism behind the observed increase in ND-TPACS of semiconductors and fluorophores in comparison to their degenerate TPA cross-sections.

ND-TPA has also been explored in two-photon microscopy for decreasing out-of-focus excitation, increasing penetration depth, increasing spatial resolution, and extending the excitation wavelength range.

== Theory ==
The following discussion of techniques for quantitatively obtaining important parameters for use in ND-TPA is a summary of concepts discussed in Yang et al.

Beer's law describes the decay in intensity due to one-photon absorption:

$$I(z) = I_0 e^{-\alpha z}$$

where z is the distance that the photon travels in a sample, I(z) is the light intensity after traveling a distance z in the sample and α is the one-photon absorption coefficient of the sample.

In ND-TPA, two different color photons come together, providing the following adaptation of the previous equation, and using a near-infrared (NIR) and short-wavelength infrared (SWIR) photon for ease of interpretation:

$$I(z) = A \, I_\mathrm{NIR}(0) \, I_\mathrm{SWIR}(0) \, e^{-z (\alpha_\mathrm{NIR} + \, \alpha_\mathrm{SWIR})} \,$$

where A is a combined term describing the absorption cross section, collection efficiency, fluorophore concentration and quantum efficiency.

For fluorescence with a non-uniform flux, as exists in ND-TPA, the following equation qualifies:

$$F = K \iint \sigma \, I_\mathrm{NIR}(t,r,z) \, I_\mathrm{SWIR}(t-t_0,r-r_0,z) \, dVdt$$

where K is the product of the quantum yield of the fluorophore, geometry of the imaging system and the fluorophore concentration and is assumed to be independent of the excitation regime, and σ is the absorption cross section. Note that the desynchronization level of the two laser pulses, as shown through the time and spatial delay in I_{SWIR}, affects the overall fluorescence of a given volume within a specimen. Also important to note is that photon beam fluxes can be combined in this fashion, allowing for one photon flux to be increased proportionally to the decrease in flux experienced by another photon due to scattering effects, as in biological tissue.

== Advantages of ND-TPA ==
The near-simultaneous injection of different-energy photons into a specimen poses advantages over the traditional method of same-energy degenerate two photon excitation. These advantages can be explained by the enhanced VSL and, thus, larger absorption cross-section.

=== Brighter Fluorescence ===
Because of the longer VSL, there is a higher likelihood of promotion of an electron to an excited singlet state by the second photon, compared to degenerate two-photon excitation. Instead of increased Rayleigh or Raman scattering taking place from the virtual state, more electrons in a given excitation plane are likely to promote to the excited state, followed by larger rates of emission to the ground state. This larger amount of emission events translates to higher fluorescence intensity in a sample at a given spot, increasing signal-to-noise ratio and decreasing the effects of out-of-focus excitation.

=== Depth of Penetration ===
Even though same-energy two-photon excitation microscopy provides a better depth of penetration than confocal microscopy, it is still confined to ~1mm depths, which is approximately the transport mean free path of biological tissue. Due to the increased VSL, absorption cross-section, and thus fluorescent intensity, ND-TPA provides a larger depth of penetration than degenerate two-photon microscopy, allowing for fluorescent emission deeper in a sample. At every depth location in a sample, ND-TPA provides brighter fluorescence than traditional two-photon absorption, thus allowing for visualizable fluorescence at depths impossible for traditional two-photon microscopy. Due to the high scattering nature of higher energy photons, and the ability of beam fluxes to be combined multiplicatively, beam fluxes can simply be tuned so that lower-energy photons are administered at a higher fluence rate, thus accounting for the loss in higher-energy photons at larger depths within a sample.

=== Longer Excitation Wavelength Range ===
The combination of two photons of different wavelengths allows for a larger absorption cross-section, thereby accommodating for larger ranges of excitation than degenerate two-photon microscopy. Traditional degenerate two-photon microscopy is confined to photons with energies that, when doubled, account for the energy difference between ground and excited electron states, however, in biological tissue, this confines degenerate two-photon excitation to the near-infrared wavelength optical window, due to enhanced depth of penetration and energy requirements. With ND-TPA, virtually any wavelength may be used, so long as the second photon accounts for the remaining energy difference between the virtual state and the excited singlet state. This combined two-photon excitation has been demonstrated for fluorophores requiring equivalent one-photon excitation wavelengths of 266 nm and 1013 nm.

=== Enhanced Spatial Resolution ===
When combined with degenerate two-photon absorption in microscopy settings, ND-TPA can provide better spatial resolution and axial sectioning. Because of the requirement for laser beams to be approximately synchronized in ND-TPA, a desynchronization event can "turn off" entire fluorophores, while the degenerately-excited fluorophores remain "on". This allows for the overlay of degenerate and non-degenerate two-photon microscopy images to pinpoint locations of specific structures like genes or sub cellular components. The use of further optical or reconstructive additions, like a shaded ring filter or beam-shaping techniques, enables further resolution optimization.

== Development of a Non-degenerate Two Photon Microscope ==
To implement non-degenerate two photon excitation microscopy, two photon pulses of differing energies must be synchronized to interact with a specimen at the sample plane near-simultaneously. Due to the enhanced absorption cross section and VSL, more time is possible for excitation to occur, and thus perfect synchronization is unnecessary. However, close synchronization of pulses, within ~10ns is preferred. For this and other logistical reasons, a single Ti:Sapphire femtosecond laser is used to create a single laser pulse train. After passing through a half wave plate to rotate the plane of polarization, the laser beam passes through a polarization beam splitter and is separated into two beams. One beam passes into an optical parametric oscillator (OPO), which splits the incoming high frequency beam into lower frequency components, and the resulting beam is of longer wavelength and lower energy than the incoming beam; this beam also passes through an automated defocuser. The second beam is redirected through a delay line, with mirrors optimized to near-perfectly synchronize the higher energy laser pulse with the lower energy output of the OPO. Both beams pass through half wave plates once again before meeting at a dichroic mirror which allows preselected low wavelength laser beams to pass through, while high wavelength beams are reflected orthogonally to meet and mix with the lower-wavelength beam. This mixed beam, consisting of two different-wavelength beams, passes through another dichroic mirror before being focused by an objective onto the specimen. The resulting incoherent fluorescence is partially redirected through the objective and reflected off the second dichroic mirror into another dichroic mirror, which again reflects the beam into a band-pass filter before it passes into a photomultiplier tube (PMT). This signal is then imaged.
