= Applied Films Corporation =

- Industry: Electronics
- Founded: Boulder, Colorado, United States (1976)

Applied Films Corporation manufactured electrodes on glass for flat panel displays. These electrodes are used in liquid crystal displays (LCD), plasma displays, and auto-dimming car mirrors utilizing electrochromism. Major early customers were Burroughs (now Unisys) in New Jersey, IBM in East Fishkill and Kingston, New York, numerous Asian producers of LCDs, Gentex in Holland, Michigan, Plasmaco (now Panasonic Plasma Display Lab) in Highland, New York, and Samsung in Gumi, South Korea. The main method of coating these electrodes on glass was magnetron sputter deposition, specifically the planar magnetron A US patent 4166018 A, John S. Chapin, "Sputtering process and apparatus", published 1979-08-28, assigned to Airco, Inc., later assigned to BOC Group Inc.. The main materials were indium tin oxide transparent electrical conductor, silicon dioxide diffusion barrier, and chromium and copper conductors.

AFC progressed from supplying coated glass to supplying the thin film coating equipment to produce these electrodes. AFC merged with the large area display coating divisions of Donnelly Mirrors of Holland, Michigan (now Magna International of Ontario, Canada) in 1992, and with Balzers and Leybold (Unaxis Corporation) of Alzenau, Germany in 2000. In 2004 AFC acquired the equipment division of Helix Corporation in Tainan, Taiwan, and it 2005 acquired VACT, Inc. of Fairfield, CA. AFC also owned a 50% interest in STEC Ltd. from 1998 to 2005., STEC was a joint venture with Nippon Sheet Glass of Japan, which used AFC equipment for electrodes for LCDs. AFC sold its interest in this venture to Nippon Sheet Glass in 2005 as AFC focused exclusively on manufacturing thin film coating equipment.

AFC was acquired by Applied Materials in 2006. At the time of acquisition, AFC operated three product divisions, Display, Web (roll to roll products) and coated glass (low-e coatings for architectural glass applications). Approximate AFC revenues at the time of acquisition were $220M with approximately 750 people.
