= Gary E. Dickerson =

American businessperson

Gary E. Dickerson (born 1957) is a business leader in the semiconductor industry. He is best known for his position as CEO of Applied Materials and as an advocate for the sustainable development of the semiconductor industry and environmental responsibility.

== Early life and education ==
Dickerson was born in 1957 and earned a Bachelor of Science degree in Engineering Management from the University of Missouri, Rolla, and an MBA from the University of Missouri - Kansas City.

His career began in General Motors' Delco Electronics Division and AT&T Technologies, working in manufacturing and engineering management. He then worked at KLA-Tencor Corporation for 18 years in a variety of roles in operations and product development until he was made president and chief operating officer. He then became CEO of Varian Semiconductor Equipment Associates Inc. and held that position for seven years. In 2011 he negotiated Applied Materials' $4.9bn cash acquisition of Varian Semiconductor Equipment Associates Inc. Afterwards, he became president and CEO of Applied Materials, Inc.

Dickerson prioritized new product development when taking over as CEO in 2013. Under his leadership, he boosted R&D spending from about 56% of operating expenses in 2013 to 69% in 2020, marking a new record for the company.

Another focus of Dickerson’s leadership in his first two years at Applied was driving innovation by training employees on a blueprint for defining innovative products and technology, which he calls the “Product Development Engine”. This methodology allows Applied to see shifts in the markets sooner and develop solutions faster.

Under Dickerson’s leadership, Applied Materials has been recognized by Fortune’s World’s Most Admired Companies (2023), Time’s 100 Most Innovative Companies (2023), Barron’s 100 Most Sustainable Companies (2022, 2023), IBD’s Best ESG Companies (2023), HRC Equality 100 Leader in LGBTQ+ Workplace Inclusion (2023–24), Glassdoor’s Best Places to Work (2024), and the U.S. Department of Labor Gold Award (HIREVets).

In May 2023, Applied Materials announced a plan to invest up to $4 billion to create the EPIC Center, a new R&D facility dedicated to semiconductor equipment and processes. Dickerson stated that the project is needed to help overcome new technical challenges and maintain the pace of chip advancement.

His total compensation for 2023 was: $27,000,000.

== Awards and recognition ==
Dickerson was recognized as one of Barron’s World’s Best CEOs in 2017, 2018 and 2019.

In 2020, Dickerson signed the CEO Action for Diversity and Inclusion Pledge in support of more inclusive workplaces.

In 2023, Dickerson was recognized for the SEMI Sustainability Excellence Award for his contributions behind the semiconductor industry’s Net Zero target through Applied's ESG work. He was also recognized by Forbes as one of America's Most Innovative Leaders in 2019, and by Harvard Business Review as one of the Best Performing CEOs in the World.

In 2024, Dickerson was awarded the Public Service Star (Distinguished Friends of Singapore) by Mr. Tharman Shanmugaratnam, President of the Republic of Singapore, for his contributions to their local ecosystem through the creation of jobs and business opportunities.

== Philanthropy and community involvement ==
Dickerson currently serves on the Industry Advisory Council of Singapore’s Economic Development Board.
