= Ion implantation =

Use of ions to cause chemical changes

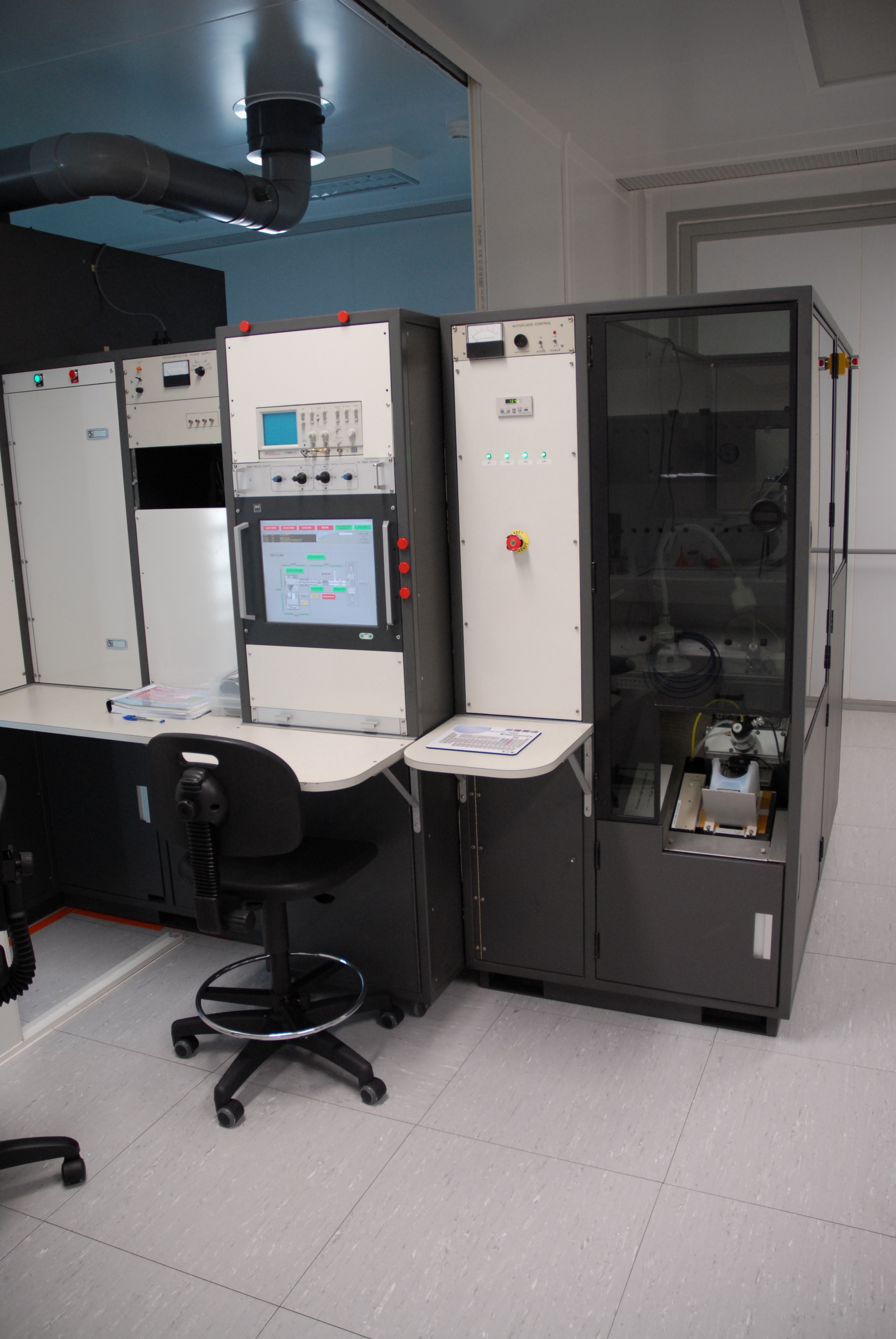
An ion implantation system at LAAS technological facility in Toulouse, France.

Ion implantation is a low-temperature process by which ions of one element are accelerated into a solid target, thereby changing the target's physical, chemical, or electrical properties. Ion implantation is used in semiconductor device fabrication and in metal finishing, as well as in materials science research. The ions can alter the elemental composition of the target (if the ions differ in composition from the target) if they stop and remain in the target. Ion implantation also causes chemical and physical changes when the ions impinge on the target at high energy. The crystal structure of the target can be damaged or even destroyed by the energetic collision cascades, and ions of sufficiently high energy (tens of MeV) can cause nuclear transmutation.

== General principle ==
Ion implantation setup with mass separator

Ion implantation equipment typically consists of an ion source, where ions of the desired element are produced, an accelerator, where the ions are electrostatically accelerated to a high energy or using radiofrequency, and a target chamber, where the ions impinge on a target, which is the material to be implanted. Thus ion implantation is a special case of particle radiation. Each ion is typically a single atom or molecule, and thus the actual amount of material implanted in the target is the integral over time of the ion current. This amount is called the dose. The currents supplied by implants are typically small (micro-amperes), and thus the dose which can be implanted in a reasonable amount of time is small. Therefore, ion implantation finds application in cases where the amount of chemical change required is small.

Typical ion energies are in the range of 10 to 500 keV (1,600 to 80,000 aJ). Energies in the range 1 to 10 keV (160 to 1,600 aJ) can be used, but result in a penetration of only a few nanometers or less. Energies lower than this result in very little damage to the target, and fall under the designation ion beam deposition. Higher energies can also be used: accelerators capable of 5 MeV (800,000 aJ) are common. However, there is often great structural damage to the target, and because the depth distribution is broad (Bragg peak), the net composition change at any point in the target will be small.

The energy of the ions, as well as the ion species and the composition of the target determine the depth of penetration of the ions in the solid: A monoenergetic ion beam will generally have a broad depth distribution. The average penetration depth is called the range of the ions. Under typical circumstances ion ranges will be between 10 nanometers and 1 micrometer. Thus, ion implantation is especially useful in cases where the chemical or structural change is desired to be near the surface of the target. Ions gradually lose their energy as they travel through the solid, both from occasional collisions with target atoms (which cause abrupt energy transfers) and from a mild drag from overlap of electron orbitals, which is a continuous process. The loss of ion energy in the target is called stopping and can be simulated with the binary collision approximation method.

Accelerator systems for ion implantation are generally classified into medium current (ion beam currents between 10 μA and ~2 mA), high current (ion beam currents up to ~30 mA), high energy (ion energies above 200 keV and up to 10 MeV), and very high dose (efficient implant of dose greater than 10^{16}ions/cm^{2}).

=== Ion source ===
All varieties of ion implantation beamline designs contain general groups of functional components (see image). The first major segment of an ion beamline includes an ion source used to generate the ion species. The source is closely coupled to biased electrodes for extraction of the ions into the beamline and most often to some means of selecting a particular ion species for transport into the main accelerator section.

The ion source is often made of materials with a high melting point such as tungsten, tungsten doped with lanthanum oxide (lanthanated tungsten), molybdenum and tantalum. Lanthanum oxide helps extend the life of the ion source. Often, inside the ion source a plasma is created between two tungsten electrodes, called reflectors, using a gas often based on fluorine or hydrogen containing the ion to be implanted whether it is germanium, boron, or silicon, such as boron trifluoride, boron difluoride, germanium tetrafluoride or silicon tetrafluoride. Arsine gas or phosphine gas can be used in the ion source to provide arsenic or phosphorus respectively for implantation. The ion source also has an indirectly heated cathode. Alternatively this heated cathode can be used as one of the reflectors, eliminating the need for a dedicated one, or a directly heated cathode is used.

Oxygen-based gases (oxides) can be used to provide ions for implantation such as carbon dioxide for implanting carbon. Hydrogen or hydrogen with xenon, krypton or argon may be added to the plasma to delay the degradation of tungsten components due to the halogen cycle. The hydrogen can come from a high pressure cylinder or from a hydrogen generator that uses electrolysis. Repellers at each end of the ion source continually move the atoms from one end of the ion source to the other, resembling two mirrors pointed at each other constantly reflecting light.

The ions are extracted from the source by an extraction electrode outside the ion source through a slit shaped aperture in the source, then the ion beam then passes through an analysis magnet to select the ions that will be implanted and then passes through one or two linear accelerators (linacs) that accelerate the ions before they reach the wafer in a process chamber. In medium current ion implanters there is also a neutral ion trap before the process chamber to remove neutral ions from the ion beam.

Some dopants such as aluminum, are often not provided to the ion source as a gas but as a solid compound based on Chlorine or Iodine that is vaporized in a nearby crucible such as Aluminium iodide or Aluminium chloride or as a solid sputtering target inside the ion source made of Aluminium oxide or Aluminium nitride. Implanting antimony often requires the use of a vaporizer attached to the ion source, in which antimony trifluoride, antimony trioxide, or solid antimony are vaporized in a crucible and a carrier gas is used to route the vapors to an adjacent ion source, although it can also be implanted from a gas containing fluorine such as antimony hexafluoride or vaporized from liquid antimony pentafluoride. Gallium, Selenium and Indium are often implanted from solid sources such as selenium dioxide for selenium although it can also be implanted from hydrogen selenide. Crucibles often last 60–100 hours and prevent ion implanters from changing recipes or process parameters in less than 20–30 minutes. Ion sources can often last 300 hours.

The "mass" selection (just like in mass spectrometer) is often accompanied by passage of the extracted ion beam through a magnetic field region with an exit path restricted by blocking apertures, or "slits", that allow only ions with a specific value of the product of mass and velocity/charge to continue down the beamline. If the target surface is larger than the ion beam diameter and a uniform distribution of implanted dose is desired over the target surface, then some combination of beam scanning and wafer motion is used. Finally, the implanted surface is coupled with some method for collecting the accumulated charge of the implanted ions so that the delivered dose can be measured in a continuous fashion and the implant process stopped at the desired dose level.

== Application in semiconductor device fabrication ==
=== Doping ===
Semiconductor doping with boron, phosphorus, or arsenic is a common application of ion implantation. When implanted in a semiconductor, each dopant atom can create a charge carrier in the semiconductor after annealing. Annealing is necessary after ion implantation to activate dopants and can be carried out using a tube or batch furnace, Rapid Thermal Processing, flash lamp anneal, laser anneal or other annealing techniques. A hole can be created for a p-type dopant, and an electron for an n-type dopant. This modifies the conductivity of the semiconductor in its vicinity. The technique is used, for example, for adjusting the threshold voltage of a MOSFET. Ion implantation is practical due to the high sensitivity of semiconductor devices to foreign atoms, as ion implantation does not deposit large numbers of atoms. Sometimes such as during the manufacturing of SiC devices, ion implantation is carried out while heating the SiC wafer to 500 °C. This is known as a hot implant and it is used to control damage to the surface of the semiconductor. Cryogenic implants (Cryo-implants) can have the same effect.

The energies used in doping often vary from 1 KeV to 3 MeV and it is not possible to build an ion implanter capable of providing ions at any energy due to physical limitations. To increase the throughput of ion implanters, efforts have been made to increase the current of the beam created by the implanter. The beam can be scanned across the wafer magnetically, electrostatically, mechanically or with a combination of these techniques. A mass analyzer magnet is used to select the ions that will be implanted on the wafer. Ion implantation is also used in displays containing LTPS transistors.

Ion implantation was developed as a method of producing the p-n junction of photovoltaic devices in the late 1970s and early 1980s, along with the use of pulsed-electron beam for rapid annealing, although pulsed-electron beam for rapid annealing has not to date been used for commercial production. Ion implantation is not used in most photovoltaic silicon cells, instead, thermal diffusion doping is used.

=== Silicon on insulator ===
One prominent method for preparing silicon on insulator (SOI) substrates from conventional silicon substrates is the SIMOX (separation by implantation of oxygen) process, wherein a buried high dose oxygen implant is converted to silicon oxide by a high temperature annealing process.

=== Mesotaxy ===
Mesotaxy is the term for the growth of a crystallographically matching phase underneath the surface of the host crystal (compare to epitaxy, which is the growth of the matching phase on the surface of a substrate). In this process, ions are implanted at a high enough energy and dose into a material to create a layer of a second phase, and the temperature is controlled so that the crystal structure of the target is not destroyed. The crystal orientation of the layer can be engineered to match that of the target, even though the exact crystal structure and lattice constant may be very different. For example, after the implantation of nickel ions into a silicon wafer, a layer of nickel silicide can be grown in which the crystal orientation of the silicide matches that of the silicon.

== Application in metal finishing ==
=== Tool steel toughening ===
Nitrogen or other ions can be implanted into a tool steel target (drill bits, for example). The structural change caused by the implantation produces a surface compression in the steel, which prevents crack propagation and thus makes the material more resistant to fracture. The chemical change can also make the tool more resistant to corrosion.

=== Surface finishing ===
In some applications, for example prosthetic devices such as artificial joints, it is desired to have surfaces very resistant to both chemical corrosion and wear due to friction. Ion implantation is used in such cases to engineer the surfaces of such devices for more reliable performance. As in the case of tool steels, the surface modification caused by ion implantation includes both a surface compression which prevents crack propagation and an alloying of the surface to make it more chemically resistant to corrosion.

== Other applications ==
=== Ion beam mixing ===
Ion implantation can be used to achieve ion beam mixing, i.e. mixing up atoms of different elements at an interface. This may be useful for achieving graded interfaces or strengthening adhesion between layers of immiscible materials.

=== Ion implantation-induced nanoparticle formation ===
Ion implantation may be used to induce nano-dimensional particles in oxides such as sapphire and silica. The particles may be formed as a result of precipitation of the ion implanted species, they may be formed as a result of the production of a mixed oxide species that contains both the ion-implanted element and the oxide substrate, and they may be formed as a result of a reduction of the substrate, first reported by Hunt and Hampikian. Typical ion beam energies used to produce nanoparticles range from 50 to 150 keV, with ion fluences that range from 10^{16} to 10^{18} ions/cm^{2}. The table below summarizes some of the work that has been done in this field for a sapphire substrate. A wide variety of nanoparticles can be formed, with size ranges from 1 nm on up to 20 nm and with compositions that can contain the implanted species, combinations of the implanted ion and substrate, or that are comprised solely from the cation associated with the substrate.

Composite materials based on dielectrics such as sapphire that contain dispersed metal nanoparticles are promising materials for optoelectronics and nonlinear optics.

	Implanted Species	Substrate	Ion Beam Energy (keV)	Fluence (ions/cm^{2})	Post Implantation Heat Treatment	Result	Source
Produces Oxides that Contain the Implanted Ion	Co	Al_{2}O_{3}	65	5*10^{17}	Annealing at 1400 °C	Forms Al_{2}CoO_{4} spinel	
Produces Oxides that Contain the Implanted Ion	Co	α-Al_{2}O_{3}	150	2*10^{17}	Annealing at 1000 °C in oxidizing ambient	Forms Al_{2}CoO_{4} spinel	
Produces Oxides that Contain the Implanted Ion	Mg	Al_{2}O_{3}	150	5*10^{16}	---	Forms MgAl_{2}O_{4} platelets	
Produces Oxides that Contain the Implanted Ion	Sn	α-Al_{2}O_{3}	60	1*10^{17}	Annealing in O_{2} atmosphere at 1000 °C for 1 hr	30 nm SnO_{2} nanoparticles form	
Produces Oxides that Contain the Implanted Ion	Zn	α-Al_{2}O_{3}	48	1*10^{17}	Annealing in O_{2} atmosphere at 600 °C	ZnO nanoparticles form	
Produces Oxides that Contain the Implanted Ion	Zr	Al_{2}O_{3}	65	5*10^{17}	Annealing at 1400 °C	ZrO_{2} precipitates form	
Produces Metallic Nanoparticles from Implanted Species	Ag	α-Al_{2}O_{3}	1500, 2000	2*10^{16}, 8*10^{16}	Annealing from 600 °C to 1100 °C in oxidizing, reducing, Ar or N_{2} atmospheres	Ag nanoparticles in Al_{2}O_{3} matrix	
Produces Metallic Nanoparticles from Implanted Species	Au	α-Al_{2}O_{3}	160	0.6*10^{17}, 1*10^{16}	1 hr at 800 °C in air	Au nanoparticles in Al_{2}O_{3} matrix	
Produces Metallic Nanoparticles from Implanted Species	Au	α-Al_{2}O_{3}	1500, 2000	2*10^{16}, 8*10^{16}	Annealing from 600 °C to 1100 °C in oxidizing, reducing, Ar or N_{2} atmospheres	Au nanoparticles in Al_{2}O_{3} matrix	
Produces Metallic Nanoparticles from Implanted Species	Co	α-Al_{2}O_{3}	150	<5*10^{16}	Annealing at 1000 °C	Co nanoparticles in Al_{2}O_{3} matrix	
Produces Metallic Nanoparticles from Implanted Species	Co	α-Al_{2}O_{3}	150	2*10^{17}	Annealing at 1000 °C in reducing ambient	Precipitation of metallic Co	
Produces Metallic Nanoparticles from Implanted Species	Fe	α-Al_{2}O_{3}	160	1*10^{16} to 2*10^{17}	Annealing for 1 hr from 700 °C to 1500 °C in reducing ambient	Fe nanocomposites	
Produces Metallic Nanoparticles from Implanted Species	Ni	α-Al_{2}O_{3}	64	1*10^{17}	---	1-5 nm Ni nanoparticles	
Produces Metallic Nanoparticles from Implanted Species	Si	α-Al_{2}O_{3}	50	2*10^{16}, 8*10^{16}	Annealing at 500 °C or 1000 °C for 30 min	Si nanoparticles in Al_{2}O_{3}	
Produces Metallic Nanoparticles from Implanted Species	Sn	α-Al_{2}O_{3}	60	1*10^{17}	---	15 nm tetragonal Sn nanoparticles	
Produces Metallic Nanoparticles from Implanted Species	Ti	α-Al_{2}O_{3}	100	<5*10^{16}	Annealing at 1000 °C	Ti nanoparticles in Al_{2}O_{3}	
Produces Metallic Nanoparticles from Substrate	Ca	Al_{2}O_{3}	150	5*10^{16}	---	Al nanoparticles in amorphous matrix containing Al_{2}O_{3} and CaO	
Produces Metallic Nanoparticles from Substrate	Y	Al_{2}O_{3}	150	5*10^{16}	---	10.7± 1.8 nm Al particles in amorphous matrix containing Al_{2}O_{3} and Y_{2}O_{3}	
Produces Metallic Nanoparticles from Substrate	Y	Al_{2}O_{3}	150	2.5*10^{16}	---	9.0± 1.2 nm Al particles in amorphous matrix containing Al_{2}O_{3} and Y_{2}O_{3}	

== Problems with ion implantation ==
=== Crystallographic damage ===
Each individual ion produces many point defects in the target crystal on impact such as vacancies and interstitials. Vacancies are crystal lattice points unoccupied by an atom: in this case the ion collides with a target atom, resulting in transfer of a significant amount of energy to the target atom such that it leaves its crystal site. This target atom then itself becomes a projectile in the solid, and can cause successive collision events. Interstitials result when such atoms (or the original ion itself) come to rest in the solid, but find no vacant space in the lattice to reside. These point defects can migrate and cluster with each other, resulting in dislocation loops and other defects. Different ion species, implantation dose, and energy can lead to different types of defects. Strain and local distortion will also appear as a result of the ion implantation.

=== Damage recovery ===
Because ion implantation causes unwanted damage to the crystal structure of the target, ion implantation processing is often followed by thermal annealing to restore the crystal structure, as the thermal treatment can provide extra energy to the lattice. Some common annealing techniques include conventional furnace annealing, rapid thermal annealing (RTA), and laser annealing. RTA and laser annealing have much shorter annealing times, significantly limiting the dopant diffusion, while furnace annealing can achieve better uniformity.

=== Amorphization ===
The amount of crystallographic damage can be enough to completely amorphize the surface of the target: i.e. it can become an amorphous solid (such a solid produced from a melt is called a glass). In some cases, complete amorphization of a target is preferable to a highly defective crystal: An amorphized film can be regrown at a lower temperature than required to anneal a highly damaged crystal. Amorphisation of the substrate can occur as a result of the beam damage. For example, yttrium ion implantation into sapphire at an ion beam energy of 150 keV to a fluence of 5•10^{16} Y^{+}/cm^{2} produces an amorphous glassy layer approximately 110 nm in thickness, measured from the outer surface.

=== Sputtering ===
Some of the collision events result in atoms being ejected (sputtered) from the surface, and thus ion implantation will slowly etch away a surface. The effect is only appreciable for very large doses.

=== Ion channelling ===
A diamond cubic crystal viewed from the <110> direction, showing hexagonal ion channels.

If there is a crystallographic structure to the target, and especially in semiconductor substrates where the crystal structure is more open, particular crystallographic directions offer much lower stopping than other directions. The result is that the range of an ion can be much longer if the ion travels exactly along a particular direction, for example the <110> direction in silicon and other diamond cubic materials. This effect is called ion channelling, and, like all the channelling effects, is highly nonlinear, with small variations from perfect orientation resulting in extreme differences in implantation depth. For this reason, most implantation is carried out a few degrees off-axis, where tiny alignment errors will have more predictable effects.

Ion channelling can be used directly in Rutherford backscattering and related techniques as an analytical method to determine the amount and depth profile of damage in crystalline thin film materials.

== Safety ==
=== Hazardous materials ===
In fabricating wafers, toxic materials such as arsine and phosphine are often used in the ion implanter process. Other common carcinogenic, corrosive, flammable, or toxic elements include antimony, arsenic, phosphorus, and boron. Semiconductor fabrication facilities are highly automated, but residue of hazardous elements in machines can be encountered during servicing and in vacuum pump hardware.

=== High voltages and particle accelerators ===
High voltage power supplies used in ion accelerators necessary for ion implantation can pose a risk of electrical injury. In addition, high-energy atomic collisions can generate X-rays and, in some cases, other ionizing radiation and radionuclides. In addition to high voltage, particle accelerators such as radio frequency linear particle accelerators and laser wakefield plasma accelerators present other hazards.

== See also ==
- List of semiconductor occupations
- Stopping and Range of Ions in Matter
- Plasma-immersion ion implantation
