= Nanosphere lithography =

Nanosphere lithography (NSL) is an economical technique for generating single-layer hexagonally close packed or similar patterns of nanoscale features on nanospheres. Generally, NSL applies planar ordered arrays of nanometer-sized latex or silica spheres as lithography masks to fabricate nanoparticle arrays. NSL uses self-assembled monolayers of spheres (typically made of polystyrene, often available commercially as an aqueous suspension) as evaporation masks. These spheres can be deposited using multiple methods including Langmuir-Blodgett, dip coating, spin coating, solvent evaporation, force-assembly, and air-water interface. This method has been used to fabricate arrays of various nanopatterns, including gold nanodots with precisely controlled spacings.

== Nanosphere monolayer preparation ==
Monolayers of nanospheres, to be used as lithography masks can be created using multiple methods:

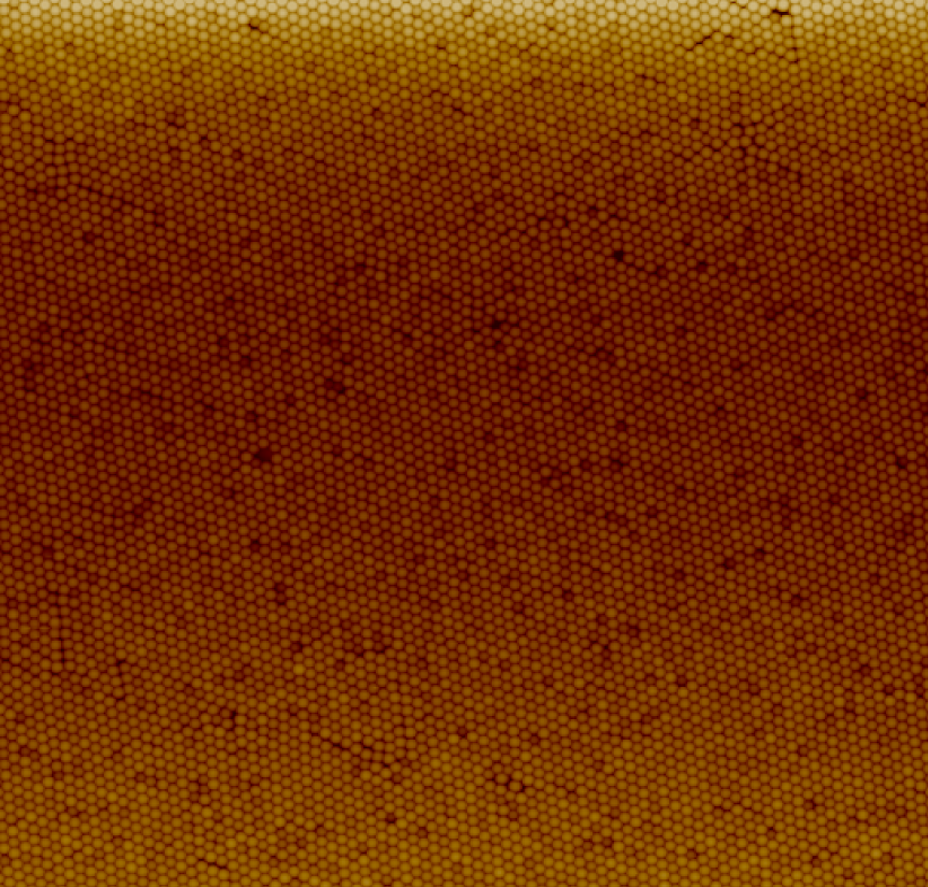
Polystyrene nanoparticle coating done with the Langmuir-Blodgett method

Langmuir-Blodgett is a deposition method in which the nanoparticles are placed in a Langmuir-Blodgett Trough floating on an aqueous solution, forming a monolayer. With the help of barriers and surface pressure sensor, the particles are compressed into the desired packing density automatically. The coating is done in this packing density with the help of a motorized dipper while the barriers maintain the desired particle packing density. The benefits of the Langmuir-Blodgett method include a strict control over the particle packing density and coating thickness (mono or multilayers can be created) as well as the ability to coat large homogeneous areas. Mask preparation with the Langmuir-Blodgett method has been demonstrated for example using SiO_{2} particles and polystyrene particles.

Dip-coating is a simplified version of the Langmuir-Blodgett. In dip coating, the nanosphere packing density isn't controlled but the dipping is performed directly on a colloidal particle solution. Dip coating is an effective method for applications where a precise control over the particle distribution isn't required.

Spin Coating and solvent evaporation methods are capable of producing large areas of particles, but with limited control over the layer homogeneity or thickness.

Solvent evaporation is accomplished via drop coating, and is arguably the simplest method to produce a monolayer of nanospheres, as the spheres are simply dropped onto the substrate and allowed to dry, self-assembling into a monolayer. Sometimes the substrate is placed at an angle or moved in circular motions to help the suspension of spheres spread and wet the entire surface.

Force-assembled monolayers are formed from a dry nanosphere powder, which can typically be obtained by centrifugation of a nanosphere suspension. The powder is then rubbed between two substrates to force them into a monolayer. The substrates are typically coated in a polymer such as polydimethylsiloxane (PDMS) to promote adhesion and spreading of the nanospheres.

The air-water interface method relies on the formation of a monolayer of nanospheres on the surface of a water bath, at the air-water interface. In this method, the substrate is held below the surface of the water, and water is then pumped out to gradually lower the surface. Eventually, the water surface is lowered below the level of the substrates, and the monolayer at the air-water interface is deposited onto the substrate surface.

== Lithography Method with Colloidal Mask ==
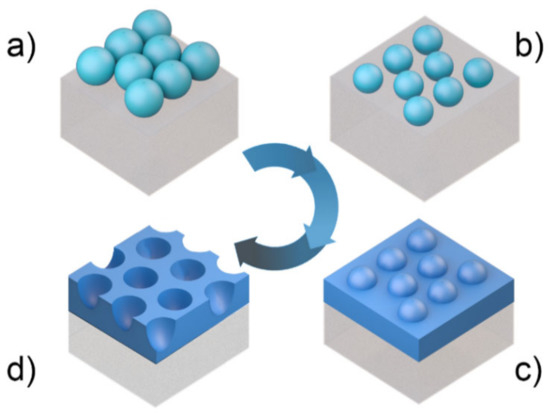
Illustration of the four main steps of a NSL process, depicting the sequence of: (a) the deposition of colloidal nano/micro-particles on a surface, which will act as mask; (b) reactive ion etching (RIE) for particle shaping, producing a non-close packed array; (c) material infiltration via physical deposition; (d) lift-off of the colloids leaving only the nano/micro-patterned material in between the particles.

NSL is an easily scalable, high-throughput, and low-cost technique that allows nanoscopic precision in an arbitrarily large area. A lithographic mask can be promptly achieved via particle self-assembly, as previously described, whose pattern resolution is entirely dependent on the colloidal size that can be deposited in high-quality monolayer arrays. The best achieved resolutions in the literature range between 50 nm and 200 nm, which is comparable to that of state-of-the-art conventional-lithography systems. Moreover, the fabricated structures can be produced with a high accuracy on a large scale, as the method is not limited in terms of the deposition area, meaning that it offers the possibility to be adapted to mass production techniques such as roll-to-roll. NSL can also be used with a large range of materials as it uses low-temperature steps (<100 °C), making it ideal for usage with temperature-sensitive materials (e.g., polymeric-based flexible substrates).

The NSL method generally starts by the preparation of the patterning mask, comprising a self-assembled monolayer array of colloidal nano/micro-particles, followed by the nano/micro-structure production. The method usually involves four main steps, as depicted in the sketch, allowing the formation of different geometries. The variety of techniques that can be used for the colloidal array formation, as well as for the subsequent structure production, shows the high versatility of this method for implementation in various applications. For instance, it is a preferential soft-lithography technique to micro-pattern photovoltaic devices, to produce structures allowing light-management and/or self-cleaning.

== See also ==
- Nanolithography
- Nanoparticle deposition
