= Langmuir–Blodgett =

Langmuir-Blodgett may refer to:

- Langmuir–Blodgett film
- Langmuir–Blodgett trough
- Irving Langmuir and Katharine Burr Blodgett
