= Plasmonic catalysis =

Catalytic process

In chemistry, plasmonic catalysis is a type of catalysis that uses plasmons to increase the rate of a chemical reaction. A plasmonic catalyst is made up of a metal nanoparticle surface (usually gold, silver, or a combination of the two) which generates localized surface plasmon resonances (LSPRs) when excited by light. These plasmon oscillations create an electron-rich region near the surface of the nanoparticle, which can be used to excite the electrons of nearby molecules.

Similar to photocatalysts, plasmonic catalysts can transfer their excitation energy to reactant molecules through resonance energy transfer (RET). Unlike photocatalysts, plasmonic catalysts can also excite reactant molecules by the release of hot carrier electrons which have a high enough energy to completely dissociate from the metal surface. The energy of these hot carrier electrons can be altered by changing the wavelength of light striking the surface and the size of the nanoparticles present, which allows the hot electrons to take on the excitation state needed to catalyze multiple different reactions.

Although the field of plasmonic catalysis is still in its infancy, there are clear advantages to utilizing a plasmon-active surface over traditional photocatalysts. Their ability to utilize energy from near-infrared, visible, and ultraviolet light gives plasmon surfaces higher light-capturing efficiency than photocatalysts, which can only utilize ultraviolet light, and the larger possible energy range of the electromagnetic field and emitted electrons make the resulting catalytic effects both broadly applicable and highly tunable.

== Mechanism ==
Broadly speaking, plasmonic catalysis increases the reaction rate through two major pathways. The first of these is through the generation of an electromagnetic field during plasmon oscillations. This field lowers the activation energy of the reaction through excitation of the reactants electrons by resonance energy transfer. It can also provide localized transition state stabilization, further increasing the rate of reaction.

The second pathway is through the generation of hot carrier electron/phonon pairs. When a plasmon is generated, some electrons may have the energy to break completely free of the nanoparticle's electron shells. These highly excited electrons can then excite reactant electrons in the highest occupied molecular orbital or fill the lowest unoccupied molecular orbital, raising the energy of the molecule and allowing for a lower energy transition state. In most cases, these hot electrons do not find a reactant molecule to excite and instead fill the phonon and return to a ground state energy. The excess energy from the process is released as thermal energy, creating a localized temperature increase which can also increase the rate of reaction.

== Examples ==
The photocatalytic electrolysis of water has been shown to be up to 66 times more efficient when using a gold nanoparticle surface.

The rate of demethylation of methylene blue by a Titanium dioxide photocatalyst has been increased sevenfold in the presence of silver nanoparticles.

The plasmonically catalyzed oxidation of several common gases- including carbon monoxide, ammonia, and oxygen- can occur at far lower temperatures than are normally required due to the strong catalytic effects of plasmonic surfaces when excited by visible light.

Recently hybrid plasmonic nanomaterials started being explored for organic synthesis or the production of solar fuels.
