= Pieter Stroeve =

American chemical engineer and academic

Pieter Stroeve (born 1945) is an American chemical engineer. He is Professor Emeritus of Chemical Engineering at the University of California, Davis.

== Education ==
Stroeve received a Bachelor of Science degree in chemical engineering from the University of California, Berkeley in 1967. He earned a Master of Science degree in 1969 and a Doctor of Science degree in chemical engineering in 1973, both from the Massachusetts Institute of Technology.His doctoral research examined diffusion with reversible chemical reactions in heterogeneous media, supervised by Clark K. Colton and Kenneth A. Smith.

== Academic career ==
Stroeve held research and visiting appointments at the Weizmann Institute of Science and Radboud University Nijmegen. In 1977, he joined the faculty of the University at Buffalo, and in 1982 moved to the University of California, Davis.

From 1994 to 2002, he was co-director of the Materials Research Science and Engineering Center for the Center on Polymeric Interfaces and Macromolecular Assemblies, a collaborative program involving Stanford University and the IBM Almaden Research Center. From 2008 to 2016, he served as co-director of the California Solar Energy Collaborative.

== Research ==
His early work investigated facilitated transport of oxygen and carbon dioxide in biological and heterogeneous systems such as blood. Beginning in the 1980s, his research extended to Langmuir and Langmuir–Blodgett films, ultrathin polymeric films, and self-assembled monolayers, with studies on adsorption and desorption kinetics at solid–liquid interfaces.

Later work addressed nanoparticle nucleation in ultrathin multilayer assemblies, template-directed synthesis of nanowires and nanocables, electrochemical deposition methods for nanoscale structures, and supported lipid bilayers. Additional areas included surface modification of nanoporous membranes, lithium-ion battery cathode materials and nanostructured surfaces for solar energy applications.

== Honors and awards ==
Stroeve was elected a Fellow of the American Institute of Chemical Engineers in 2012. He received the Distinguished Teaching Award from the Academic Senate of the University of California, Davis in 1995. He previously held a NATO Fellowship and a Minerva Fellowship at the Weizmann Institute of Science.
