= Anti-reflective coating =

Optical coating that reduces reflection

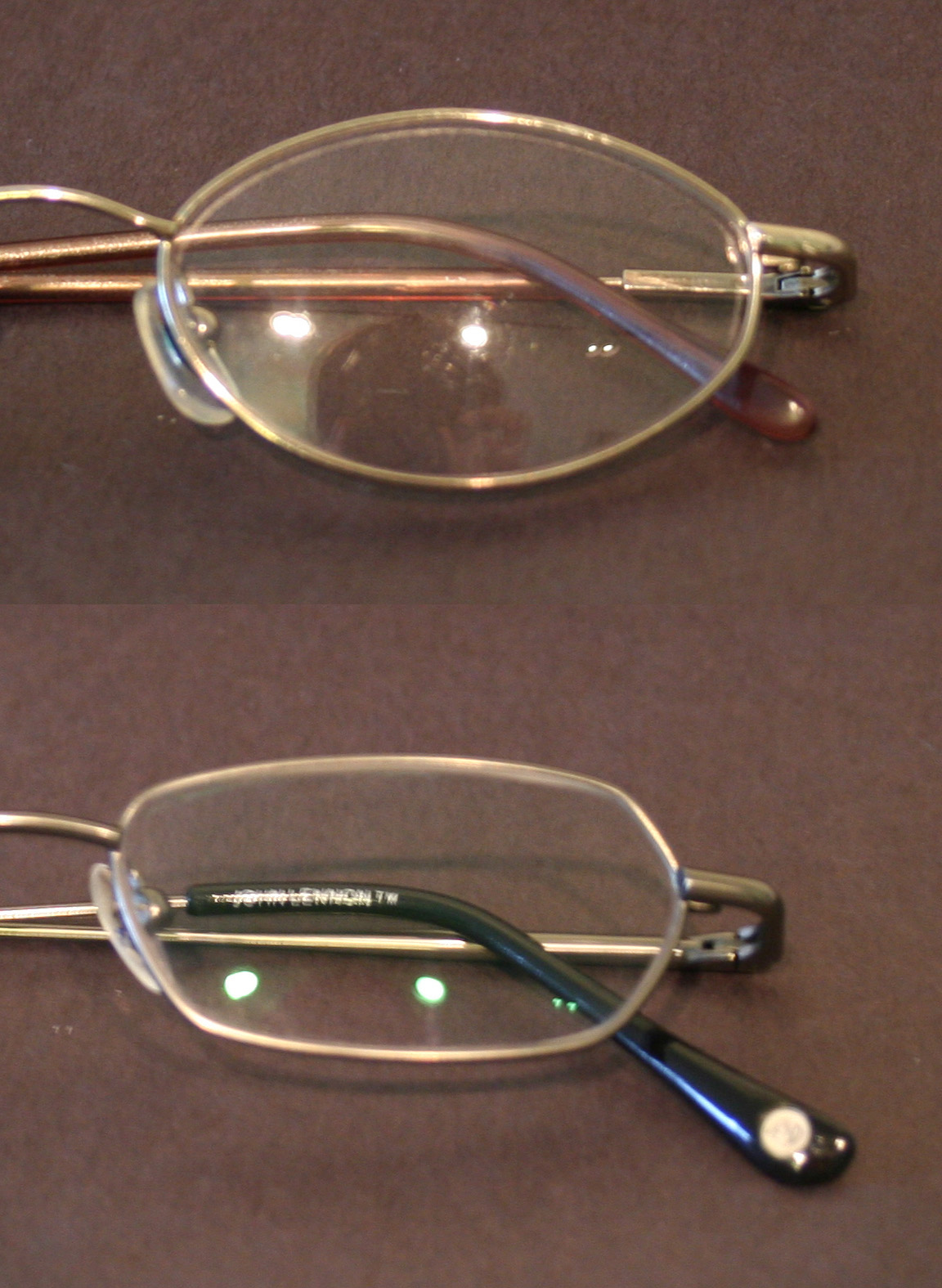
Uncoated glasses lens (top) versus lens with anti-reflective coating. The reflection from the coated lens is tinted because the coating works better at some wavelengths than others.

An anti-reflective (AR), anti-glare or anti-reflection coating is a type of optical coating applied to the surface of lenses, other optical elements, and photovoltaic cells to reduce reflection. In typical imaging systems, this improves the efficiency since less light is lost due to reflection. In complex systems such as cameras, binoculars, telescopes, and microscopes the reduction in reflections also improves the contrast of the image by elimination of stray light. This is especially important in planetary astronomy. In other applications, the primary benefit is the elimination of the reflection itself, such as a coating on eyeglass lenses that makes the eyes of the wearer more visible to others, or a coating to reduce the glint from a covert viewer's binoculars or telescopic sight.

Many coatings consist of transparent thin film structures with alternating layers of contrasting refractive index. Layer thicknesses are chosen to produce destructive interference in the beams reflected from the interfaces, and constructive interference in the corresponding transmitted beams. This makes the structure's performance change with wavelength and incident angle, so that color effects often appear at oblique angles. One must specify a wavelength range when designing or ordering such coatings, but good performance can often be achieved for a relatively wide range of frequencies: usually a choice of IR, visible, or UV is offered.

== Applications ==
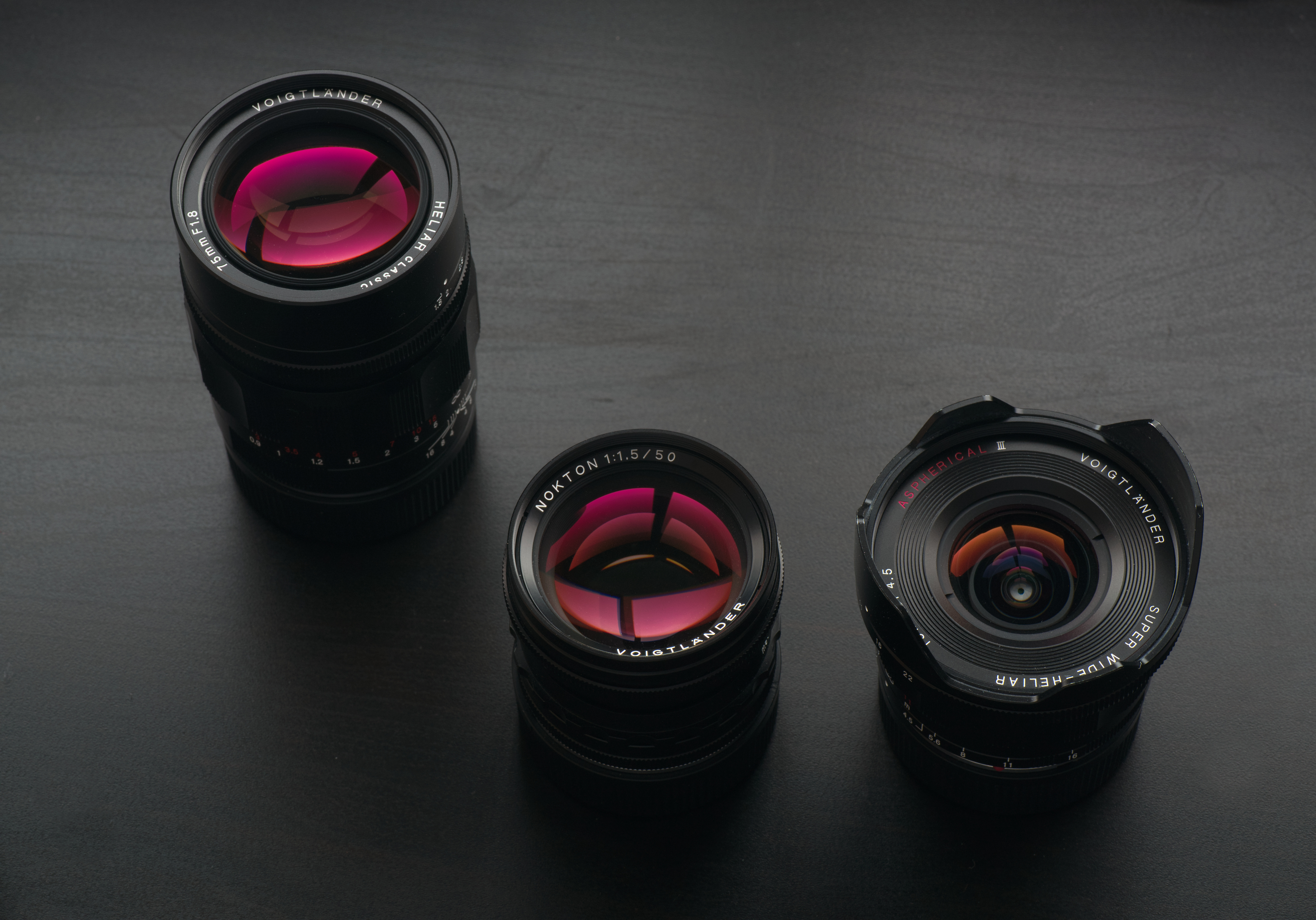
Anti-reflective coatings are often used in camera lenses, giving lens elements distinctive colors. Such colors indicate the wavelength of visible light least affected by the antireflective properties of the coating. A variety of colors can be produced whose precise hue depends entirely on the thickness of the coating. Color or cast can change radically when the coating is increased or decreased in thickness by tens of nanometers.

Anti-reflective coatings are used in a wide variety of applications where light passes through an optical surface, and low loss or low reflection is desired. Examples include anti-glare coatings on corrective lenses and camera lens elements, and antireflective coatings on solar cells.

=== Corrective lenses ===
Opticians may recommend "anti-reflection lenses" because the decreased reflection enhances the cosmetic appearance of the lenses. Such lenses are often said to reduce glare, but the reduction is very slight. Eliminating reflections allows slightly more light to pass through, producing a slight increase in contrast and visual acuity.

Antireflective ophthalmic lenses should not be confused with polarized lenses, which are found only in sunglasses and decrease (by absorption) the visible glare of sun reflected off surfaces such as sand, water, and roads. The term "antireflective" relates to the reflection from the surface of the lens itself, not the origin of the light that reaches the lens.

Many anti-reflection lenses include an additional coating that repels water and grease, making them easier to keep clean. Anti-reflection coatings are particularly suited to high-index lenses, as these reflect more light without the coating than a lower-index lens (a consequence of the Fresnel equations). It is also generally easier and cheaper to coat high index lenses.

=== Photolithography ===
Antireflective coatings (ARC) are often used in microelectronic photolithography to help reduce image distortions associated with reflections off the surface of the substrate. Different types of antireflective coatings are applied either before (Bottom ARC, or BARC) or after the photoresist, and help reduce standing waves, thin-film interference, and specular reflections.

=== Solar cells ===
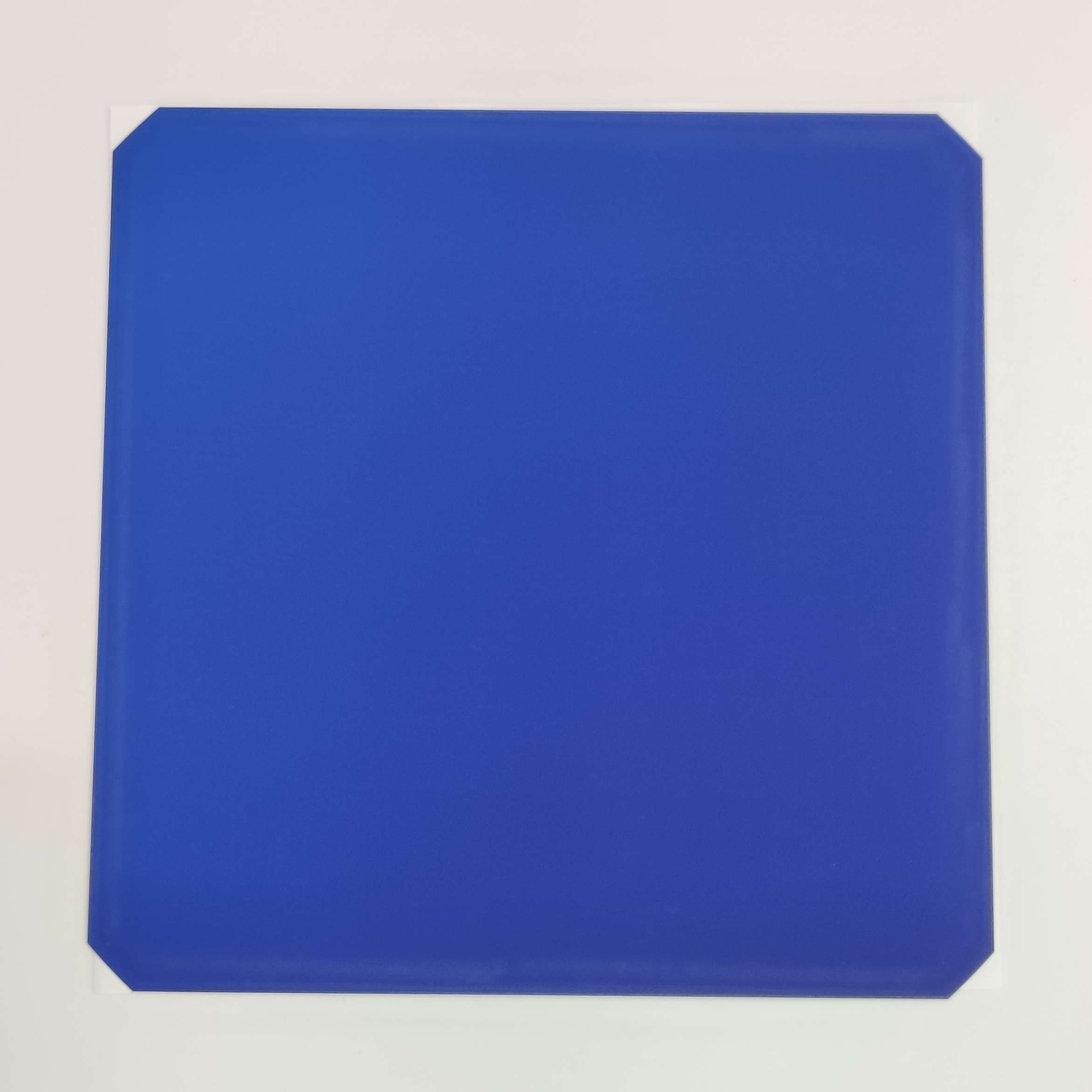
An unmetallised heterojunction solar cell precursor. The blue colour arises from the dual-purpose indium tin oxide anti-reflective coating, which also enhances emitter conduction.

Solar cells are often coated with an anti-reflective coating. Materials that have been used include magnesium fluoride, silicon nitride, silicon dioxide, titanium dioxide, and aluminum oxide.

== Types ==
=== Index-matching ===
The simplest form of anti-reflective coating was discovered by Lord Rayleigh in 1886. The optical glass available at the time tended to develop a tarnish on its surface with age, due to chemical reactions with the environment. Rayleigh tested some old, slightly tarnished pieces of glass, and found to his surprise that they transmitted more light than new, clean pieces. The tarnish replaces the air-glass interface with two interfaces: an air-tarnish interface and a tarnish-glass interface. Because the tarnish has a refractive index between those of glass and air, each of these interfaces exhibits less reflection than the air-glass interface did. In fact, the total of the two reflections is less than that of the "naked" air-glass interface, as can be calculated from the Fresnel equations.

One approach is to use graded-index (GRIN) anti-reflective coatings, that is, ones with nearly continuously varying indices of refraction. With these, it is possible to curtail reflection for a broad band of frequencies and incidence angles.

=== Single-layer interference ===
The simplest interference anti-reflective coating consists of a single thin layer of transparent material with refractive index equal to the square root of the substrate's refractive index. In air, such a coating theoretically gives zero reflectance for light with wavelength (in the coating) equal to four times the coating's thickness. Reflectance is also decreased for wavelengths in a broad band around the center. A layer of thickness equal to a quarter of some design wavelength is called a "quarter-wave layer".

The most common type of optical glass is crown glass, which has an index of refraction of about 1.52. An optimal single-layer coating would have to be made of a material with an index of about 1.23. There are no solid materials with such a low refractive index. The closest materials with good physical properties for a coating are magnesium fluoride, MgF_{2} (with an index of 1.38), and fluoropolymers, which can have indices as low as 1.30, but are more difficult to apply. MgF_{2} on a crown glass surface gives a reflectance of about 1%, compared to 4% for bare glass. MgF_{2} coatings perform much better on higher-index glasses, especially those with index of refraction close to 1.9. MgF_{2} coatings are commonly used because they are cheap and durable. When the coatings are designed for a wavelength in the middle of the visible band, they give reasonably good anti-reflection over the entire band.

Researchers have produced films of mesoporous silica nanoparticles with refractive indices as low as 1.12, which function as antireflection coatings.

=== Multi-layer interference ===
By using alternating layers of a low-index material like silica and a higher-index material, it is possible to obtain reflectivities as low as 0.1% at a single wavelength. Coatings that give very low reflectivity over a broad band of frequencies can also be made, although these are complex and relatively expensive. Optical coatings can also be made with special characteristics, such as near-zero reflectance at multiple wavelengths, or optimal performance at angles of incidence other than 0°.

=== Absorbing ===
An additional category of anti-reflection coatings is the so-called "absorbing ARC". These coatings are useful in situations where high transmission through a surface is unimportant or undesirable, but low reflectivity is required. They can produce very low reflectance with few layers, and can often be produced more cheaply, or at greater scale, than standard non-absorbing AR coatings. (See, for example, US Patent 5,091,244.) Absorbing ARCs often make use of unusual optical properties exhibited in compound thin films produced by sputter deposition. For example, titanium nitride and niobium nitride are used in absorbing ARCs. These can be useful in applications requiring contrast enhancement or as a replacement for tinted glass (for example, in a CRT display).

=== Moth eye ===
Moths' eyes have an unusual property: their surfaces are covered with a natural nanostructured film, which eliminates reflections. This allows the moth to see well in the dark, without reflections to give its location away to predators. The structure consists of a hexagonal pattern of bumps, each roughly 200 nm high and spaced on 300 nm centers. This kind of antireflective coating works because the bumps are smaller than the wavelength of visible light, so the light sees the surface as having a continuous refractive index gradient between the air and the medium, which decreases reflection by effectively removing the air-lens interface. Practical anti-reflective films have been made by humans using this effect; this is a form of biomimicry. Canon uses the moth-eye technique in their SWC subwavelength structure coating, which significantly reduces lens flare.

Such structures are also used in photonic devices, for example, moth-eye structures grown from tungsten oxide and iron oxide can be used as photoelectrodes for splitting water to produce hydrogen. The structure consists of tungsten oxide spheroids several hundred micrometers in diameter, coated with a few nanometers of iron oxide.

=== Circular polarizer ===
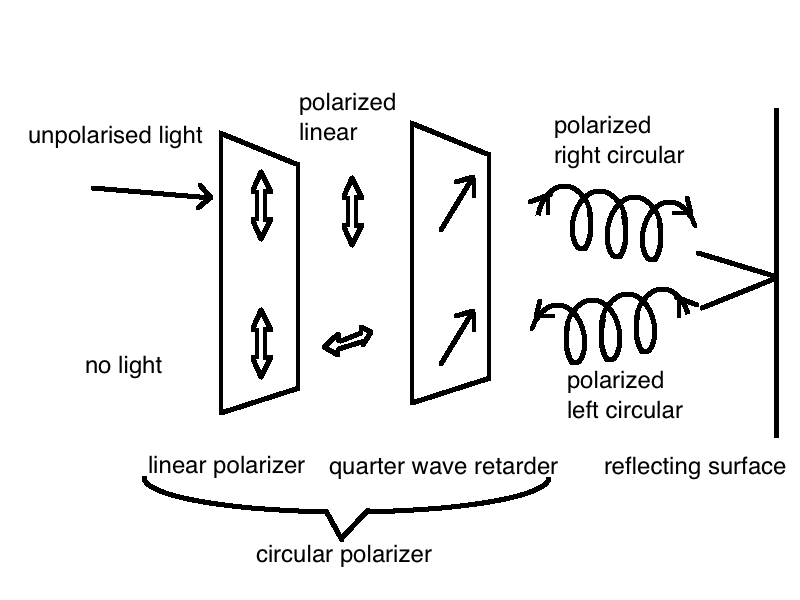
Reflections are blocked by a circular polarizer.

A circular polarizer laminated to a surface can be used to eliminate reflections. The polarizer transmits light with one chirality ("handedness") of circular polarization. Light reflected from the surface after the polarizer is transformed into the opposite "handedness". This light cannot pass back through the circular polarizer because its chirality has changed (e.g. from right circular polarized to left circularly polarized). A disadvantage of this method is that if the input light is unpolarized, the transmission through the assembly will be less than 50%.

== Theory ==
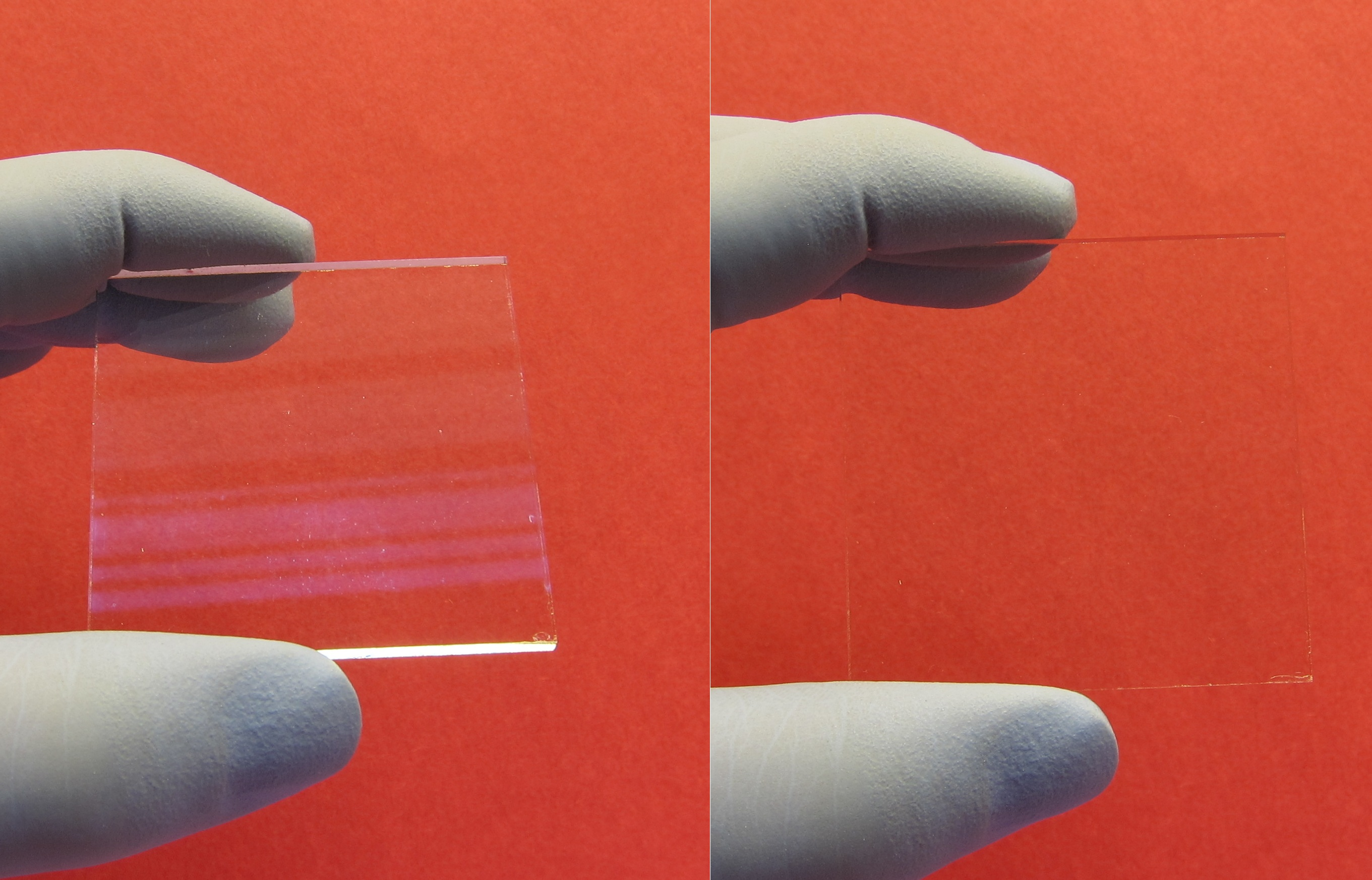
An anti-reflection coated window, shown at a 45° and a 0° angle of incidence

There are two separate causes of optical effects due to coatings, often called thick-film and thin-film effects. Thick-film effects arise because of the difference in the index of refraction between the layers above and below the coating (or film); in the simplest case, these three layers are the air, the coating, and the glass. Thick-film coatings do not depend on how thick the coating is, so long as the coating is much thicker than a wavelength of light. Thin-film effects arise when the thickness of the coating is approximately the same as a quarter or a half a wavelength of light. In this case, the reflections of a steady source of light can be made to add destructively and hence reduce reflections by a separate mechanism. In addition to depending very much on the thickness of the film and the wavelength of light, thin-film coatings depend on the angle at which the light strikes the coated surface.

=== Reflection ===
Whenever a ray of light moves from one medium to another (for example, when light enters a sheet of glass after travelling through air), some portion of the light is reflected from the surface (known as the interface) between the two media. This can be observed when looking through a window, for instance, where a (weak) reflection from the front and back surfaces of the window glass can be seen. The strength of the reflection depends on the ratio of the refractive indices of the two media, as well as the angle of the surface to the beam of light. The exact value can be calculated using the Fresnel equations.

When the light meets the interface at normal incidence (perpendicularly to the surface), the intensity of light reflected is given by the reflection coefficient, or reflectance, R:

$$R = \left( \frac{n_0 - n_S}{n_0 + n_S} \right)^2,$$

where n_{0} and n_{S} are the refractive indices of the first and second media respectively. The value of R varies from 0 (no reflection) to 1 (all light reflected) and is usually quoted as a percentage. Complementary to R is the transmission coefficient, or transmittance, T. If absorption and scattering are neglected, then the value T is always 1 − R. Thus if a beam of light with intensity I is incident on the surface, a beam of intensity RI is reflected, and a beam with intensity TI is transmitted into the medium.

Reflection and transmission of an uncoated and coated surface

For the simplified scenario of visible light travelling from air (n_{0} ≈ 1.0) into common glass (n_{S} ≈ 1.5), the value of R is 0.04, or 4%, on a single reflection. So at most 96% of the light (T = 1 − R = 0.96) actually enters the glass, and the rest is reflected from the surface. The amount of light reflected is known as the reflection loss.

In the more complicated scenario of multiple reflections, say with light travelling through a window, light is reflected both when going from air to glass and at the other side of the window when going from glass back to air. The size of the loss is the same in both cases. Light also may bounce from one surface to another multiple times, being partially reflected and partially transmitted each time it does so. In all, the combined reflection coefficient is given by 2R/(1 + R). For glass in air, this is about 7.7%.

=== Rayleigh's film ===
As observed by Lord Rayleigh, a thin film (such as tarnish) on the surface of glass can reduce the reflectivity. This effect can be explained by envisioning a thin layer of material with refractive index n_{1} between the air (index n_{0}) and the glass (index n_{S}). The light ray now reflects twice: once from the surface between air and the thin layer, and once from the layer-to-glass interface.

From the equation above and the known refractive indices, reflectivities for both interfaces can be calculated, denoted R_{01} and R_{1S} respectively. The transmission at each interface is therefore T_{01} = 1 − R_{01} and T_{1S} = 1 − R_{1S}. The total transmittance into the glass is thus T_{1S}T_{01}. Calculating this value for various values of n_{1}, it can be found that at one particular value of optimal refractive index of the layer, the transmittance of both interfaces is equal, and this corresponds to the maximal total transmittance into the glass.

This optimal value is given by the geometric mean of the two surrounding indices:

$$n_1 = \sqrt{n_0 n_S}.$$

For the example of glass (n_{S} ≈ 1.5) in air (n_{0} ≈ 1.0), this optimal refractive index is n_{1} ≈ 1.225.

The reflection loss of each interface is approximately 1.0% (with a combined loss of 2.0%), and an overall transmission T_{1S}T_{01} of approximately 98%. Therefore, an intermediate coating between the air and glass can halve the reflection loss.

=== Interference coatings ===
The use of an intermediate layer to form an anti-reflection coating can be thought of as analogous to the technique of impedance matching of electrical signals. (A similar method is used in fibre optic research, where an index-matching oil is sometimes used to temporarily defeat total internal reflection so that light may be coupled into or out of a fiber.) Further reduced reflection could in theory be made by extending the process to several layers of material, gradually blending the refractive index of each layer between the index of the air and the index of the substrate.

Practical anti-reflection coatings, however, rely on an intermediate layer not only for its direct reduction of reflection coefficient, but also use the interference effect of a thin layer. Assume the layer's thickness is controlled precisely, such that it is exactly one quarter of the wavelength of light in the layer (λ/4 = λ_{0}/(4n_{1}), where λ_{0} is the vacuum wavelength). The layer is then called a quarter-wave coating. For this type of coating a normally incident beam I, when reflected from the second interface, will travel exactly half its own wavelength further than the beam reflected from the first surface, leading to destructive interference. This is also true for thicker coating layers (3λ/4, 5λ/4, etc.), however the anti-reflective performance is worse in this case due to the stronger dependence of the reflectance on wavelength and the angle of incidence.

If the intensities of the two beams R_{1} and R_{2} are exactly equal, they will destructively interfere and cancel each other, since they are exactly out of phase. Therefore, there is no reflection from the surface, and all the energy of the beam must be in the transmitted ray, T. In the calculation of the reflection from a stack of layers, the transfer-matrix method can be used.

Interference in a quarter-wave anti-reflection coating

Real coatings do not reach perfect performance, though they are capable of reducing a surface reflection coefficient to less than 0.1%. Also, the layer will have the ideal thickness for only one distinct wavelength of light. Other difficulties include finding suitable materials for use on ordinary glass, since few useful substances have the required refractive index (n ≈ 1.23) that will make both reflected rays exactly equal in intensity. Magnesium fluoride (MgF_{2}) is often used, since this is hard-wearing and can be easily applied to substrates using physical vapor deposition, even though its index is higher than desirable (n = 1.38).

Further reduction is possible by using multiple coating layers, designed such that reflections from the surfaces undergo maximal destructive interference. One way to do this is to add a second quarter-wave thick higher-index layer between the low-index layer and the substrate. The reflection from all three interfaces produces destructive interference and anti-reflection. Other techniques use varying thicknesses of the coatings. By using two or more layers, each of a material chosen to give the best possible match of the desired refractive index and dispersion, broadband anti-reflection coatings covering the visible range (400–700 nm) with maximal reflectivity of less than 0.5% are commonly achievable.

The exact nature of the coating determines the appearance of the coated optic; common AR coatings on eyeglasses and photographic lenses often look somewhat bluish (since they reflect slightly more blue light than other visible wavelengths), though green and pink-tinged coatings are also used.

If the coated optic is used at non-normal incidence (that is, with light rays not perpendicular to the surface), the anti-reflection capabilities are degraded somewhat. This occurs because the phase accumulated in the layer relative to the phase of the light immediately reflected decreases as the angle increases from normal. This is counterintuitive, since the ray experiences a greater total phase shift in the layer than for normal incidence. This paradox is resolved by noting that the ray will exit the layer spatially offset from where it entered and will interfere with reflections from incoming rays that had to travel further (thus accumulating more phase of their own) to arrive at the interface. The net effect is that the relative phase is actually reduced, shifting the coating, such that the anti-reflection band of the coating tends to move to shorter wavelengths as the optic is tilted. Non-normal incidence angles also usually cause the reflection to be polarization-dependent.

=== Textured coatings ===
Reflection can be reduced by texturing the surface with 3D pyramids or 2D grooves (gratings).This kind of textured coating can be created using for example the Langmuir-Blodgett method.

If wavelength is greater than the texture size, the texture behaves like a gradient-index film with reduced reflection. To calculate reflection in this case, effective medium approximations can be used. To minimize reflection, various profiles of pyramids have been proposed, such as cubic, quintic or integral exponential profiles.

If wavelength is smaller than the textured size, the reflection reduction can be explained with the help of the geometric optics approximation: rays should be reflected many times before they are sent back toward the source. In this case the reflection can be calculated using ray tracing.

Using texture reduces reflection for wavelengths comparable with the feature size as well. In this case no approximation is valid, and reflection can be calculated by solving Maxwell equations numerically.

Antireflective properties of textured surfaces are well discussed in literature for a wide range of size-to-wavelength ratios (including long- and short-wave limits) to find the optimal texture size.

== History ==
As mentioned above, natural index-matching "coatings" were discovered by Lord Rayleigh in 1886. Harold Dennis Taylor of Cooke company developed a chemical method for producing such coatings in 1904.

Interference-based coatings were invented and developed in 1935 by Olexander Smakula, who was working for the Carl Zeiss optics company. These coatings remained a German military secret for several years, until the Allies discovered the secret at the end of World War II. Katharine Burr Blodgett and Irving Langmuir developed organic anti-reflection coatings known as Langmuir–Blodgett films in the late 1930s.

In 1938, 17 coating plants were operating, but were limited to military applications only. These coatings became generally available in the 1940s, with the coated Zeiss Biotar and Sonnar lenses being presented at the Leipzig Spring Fair in 1940.

== See also ==
- Anti-scratch coating
- Dichroic filter
- Lens flare, which AR coating helps to reduce.

== Sources ==
- Hecht, E. (1987). Optics (2nd ed.). Addison–Wesley. ISBN 978-0-201-11609-0.
