= Brewster angle microscope =

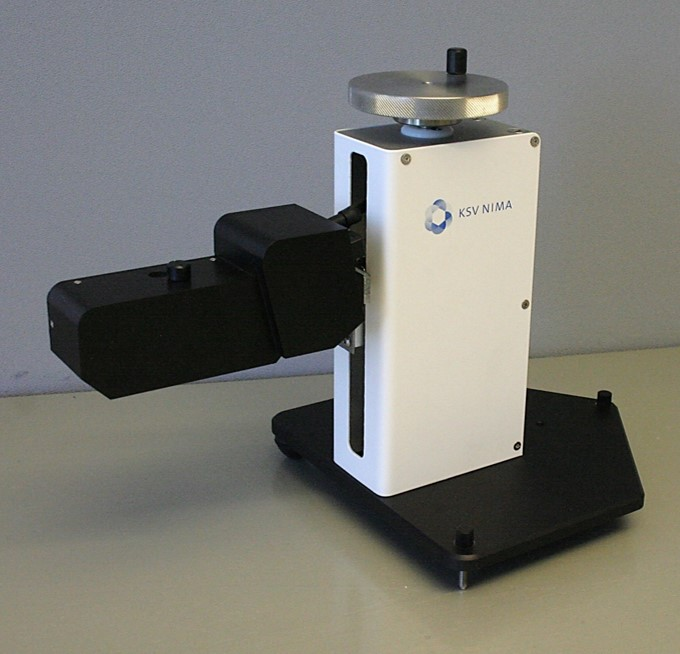
Commercial Brewster angle microscope.

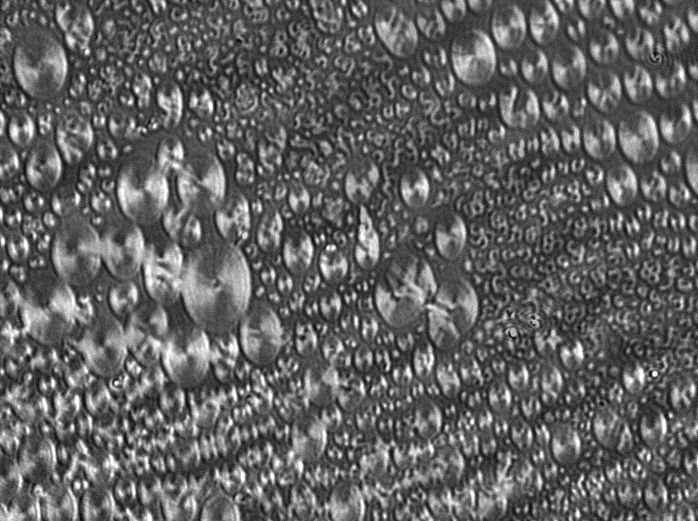
Complex phospholipid layer in liquid condensed phase in a Langmuir Trough, imaged by a Brewster angle microscope.

A Brewster angle microscope (BAM) is a microscope for studying thin films on liquid surfaces, most typically Langmuir films. In a Brewster angle microscope, both the microscope and a polarized light source are aimed towards a liquid surface at that liquid's Brewster angle, in such a way for the microscope to catch an image of any light reflected from the light source via the liquid surface. Because there is no p-polarized reflection from the pure liquid when both are angled towards it at the Brewster angle, light is only reflected when some other phenomenon such as a surface film affects the liquid surface. The technique was first introduced in 1991.

== Applications ==
Brewster angle microscopes enable the visualization of Langmuir monolayers or adsorbate films at the air-water interface for example as a function of packing density. They can be used either to study the properties of the Langmuir layer, or to indicate a suitable deposition pressure for Langmuir-Blodgett (LB) deposition. They can be used for example in the LB deposition of nanoparticles. Applications include:

Monolayer/film homogeneity. When combined with a Langmuir-Blodgett Trough, observation can be performed during compression/expansion at known surface pressures.

Optimizing the deposition parameters. Selecting optimal deposition pressure and other deposition parameters for LB coating.

Monolayer/film behavior. Observing phase changes, phase separation, domain size, shape and packing.

Monitoring of surface reactions. Photochemical reactions, polymerizations and enzyme kinetics can be followed in real time.

Monitoring and detection of surface active materials. For example, protein adsorption and nanoparticle flotation.

Lee et al. used a Brewster angle microscope to study optimal deposition parameters for Fe_{3}O_{4} nanoparticles.

Daear et al. have written a recent review on the usage of BAMs in biological applications.

== See also ==
- Brewster's angle
- Langmuir–Blodgett film
- Nanoparticle deposition
