= Katharine Blodgett Gebbie =

American astrophysicist (1932–2016)

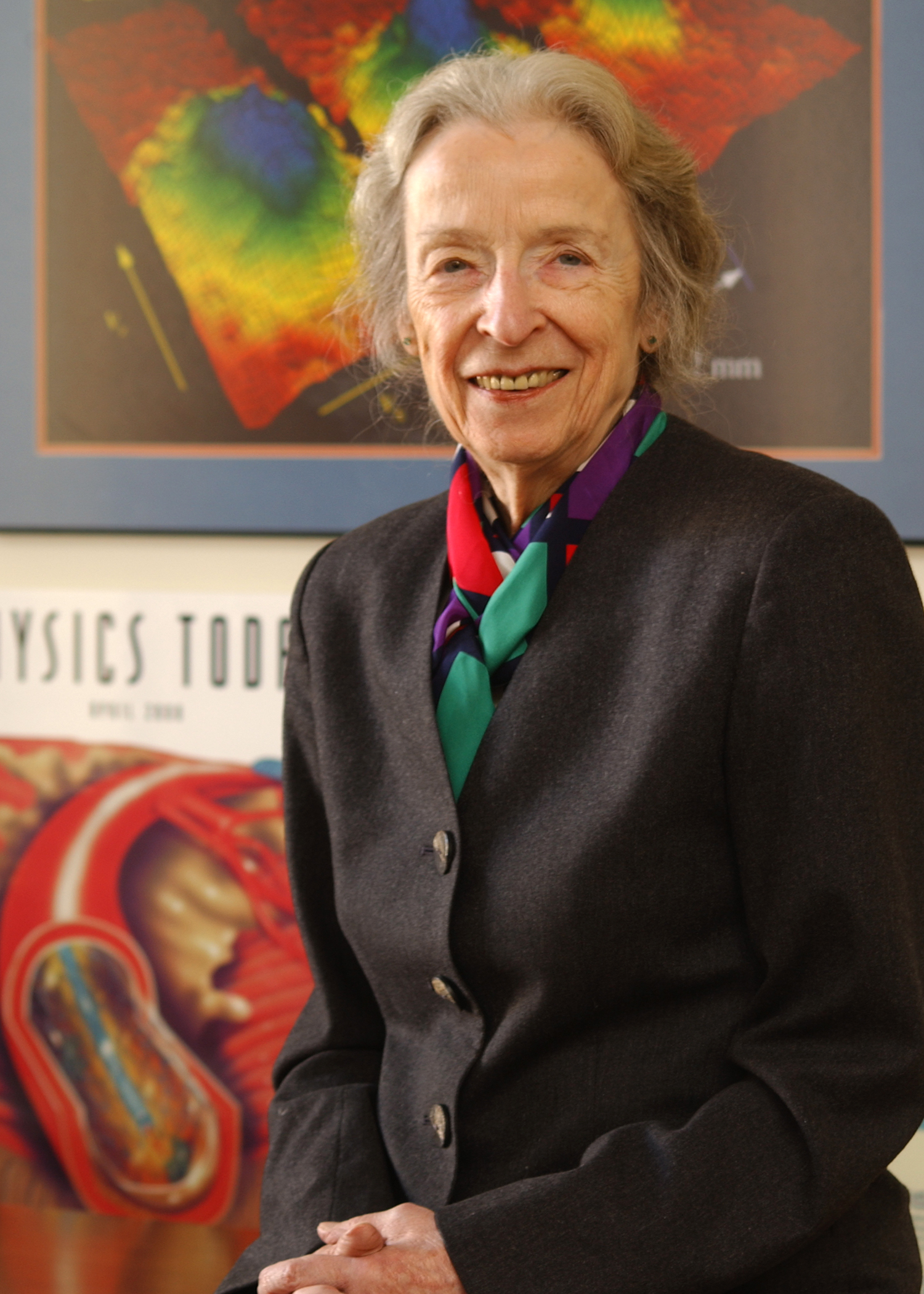
- Katharine Blodgett Gebbie (1932–2016).
- Born: Katharine Blodgett; July 4, 1932; Cambridge, Massachusetts
- Died: August 17, 2016 (aged 84); Bethesda, Maryland
- Education: Bryn Mawr College; University College London
- Known for: Directorship of the Physics Laboratory and the Physical Measurement Laboratory of the National Institute of Standards and Technology
- Awards: Distinguished Executive Presidential Rank Award, Department of Commerce Gold Medal (twice), Service to America Medal
- Scientific career
- Fields: Astrophysics
- Workplaces: University of Colorado Boulder; National Bureau of Standards; National Institute of Standards and Technology
- Doctoral advisor: Prof. Michael J. Seaton, FRS

Katharine Blodgett Gebbie (July 4, 1932 – August 17, 2016) was an American astrophysicist and civil servant. She was the founding director of the Physical Measurement Laboratory of the National Institute of Standards and Technology (NIST), and of its two immediate predecessors, the Physics Laboratory and the Center for Atomic, Molecular and Optical Physics, both for which she was the only director. During her 22 years of management of these institutions, four of its scientists were awarded the Nobel Prize in Physics. In 2015, the NIST Katharine Blodgett Gebbie Laboratory Building in Boulder, Colorado was named in her honor.

== Early life ==
Katharine Blodgett Gebbie was born as Katharine Blodgett in Cambridge, Massachusetts, on July 4, 1932. She is the namesake of her aunt, Katharine Burr Blodgett (1898-1979), who was the first woman to earn a Ph.D. in physics from the University of Cambridge, and subsequently joined the research laboratories of the General Electric Company in Schenectady, New York. In an autobiographical memoir, Gebbie recalled that on family visits her Aunt Katharine:

always arrived with suitcases full of 'apparatus', with which she showed us such wonders as how to make colors by dipping glass rods into thin films of oil floating on water.

She often spoke in later life of her aunt's influence by personal example on her choice of a career in science.

== Undergraduate education ==
Indeed, she began on the same academic pathway as her aunt, enrolling in Bryn Mawr College in 1951, where she majored in physics. Due to the death of her father, she returned in 1954 to live with her family in Cambridge, Massachusetts. There she completed her senior undergraduate year studies at the Massachusetts Institute of Technology (MIT).

== Marriage ==
At MIT she met a Scottish experimental physicist, Hugh Alastair Gebbie (1922–2005). As Katharine recalled,

"I guess it all began when I met a young man at MIT who for some reason or other wanted to marry me. And I thought at that time, I said, Well, no, I really have too many other things I want to do besides get married. And he said, "What are they?" And I said, Well, I'd like to live in London and I'd like to study astronomy and I'd like to get a Ph.D. And he said, Marry me and you will do all those things. And I did."

They married in 1957 and remained wed until Alastair's death in 2005.

== Graduate education ==
After graduation from Bryn Mawr College with a B.A. in physics in 1957, Gebbie enrolled in University College London (UCL), where she earned a B.Sc. degree in astronomy in 1960 and a Ph.D. in physics in 1964. Her Ph.D. thesis, "A theoretical study of the atmospheres of hot stars," was supervised by Prof. Michael J. Seaton, FRS, with whom she also published a study of planetary nebulae. Seaton's research group was then a center for theoretical atomic physics as well as astrophysics. Gebbie's training in both subjects set her on the path to her future career.

== Early career ==
The early 1960s were a time of significant public investment in research in both atomic physics and astrophysics, due to their combined importance for understanding the upper atmosphere, plasma diagnostics, guided missile systems, and satellite and space flight. In 1962, the National Bureau of Standards (NBS) and the University of Colorado established a cooperative research institute on the University's campus in Boulder, Colorado: the Joint Institute for Laboratory Astrophysics (JILA).

"Laboratory astrophysics" is the practice of studying, in terrestrial laboratories, the basic physical processes that are important in astrophysics, and performing theoretical and computational simulation of astrophysical phenomena from fundamental physics. Atomic, molecular, and optical (AMO) physics was (and is) one of the most important branches of fundamental physics with astrophysical applications, and it was a subject particularly emphasized at JILA. According to Gebbie,

"the physics department [of UCL], with Mike Seaton, my supervisor, had very close relations with JILA and I think I was one of three students there who eventually came to JILA. That was the best move that I think I could have made."

Gebbie started at JILA in 1966 as a research associate of the University of Colorado.

== Career at the National Bureau of Standards ==
In 1968, Gebbie was appointed to the position of Physicist at NBS, which had its own group of astrophysicists who worked in collaboration with University of Colorado colleagues at the JILA site. Other senior NBS staff at JILA who worked on astrophysics and astronomy in that era included Jeffrey L. Linsky and David G. Hummer. Gebbie worked in this capacity at JILA until 1985, except for temporary duty at NBS headquarters in Gaithersburg, Maryland, during 1981-84 . Her scientific work at JILA dealt with solar and stellar spectroscopy, radiative transfer in stellar atmospheres, and helioseismology. Some of her scientific papers from that period are listed below. In 1978, she was elected a JILA Fellow, and served as such until 1990.

While at JILA, Gebbie became friends with former NBS Director Edward Condon. She recalled him fondly in later life, and two portraits of him were mounted on the walls of her office in Gaithersburg, Maryland.

== Introduction to technical management ==
Gebbie recalled that,

Around 1980, I think it was, NIST [NBS] really decided it was focusing more on support for industry and not astrophysics. . .I didn't see that my career was going to thrive and I took an opportunity to come [to NBS headquarters in Gaithersburg, Maryland]

At the time, the technical activities of NBS were pursued in three laboratory-level organizations: National Measurement Laboratory, National Engineering Laboratory, and Institute for Computer Sciences and Technology. The central office of each of these units had a program and planning team that dealt with a variety of matters associated with operating a diverse national standards laboratory. There was also such a team that supported the office of the Director of NBS, called the Program Office. These teams consisted largely of bench scientists who were assigned full-time to the team for a period of one or two years. Those scientists would then return to technical units, often in line management positions. Duty in a program office was a common practice of scientists who sought to move into organizational management.

Gebbie joined the program team in the National Measurement Laboratory in 1981, and spent 1982–1984 in the NBS Program Office. During this period she acquired extensive experience in NBS organizational structure, practices and culture at the executive level; broad understanding of technical programs across the NBS laboratories; and personal acquaintance with NBS senior executives. At the end of this period she was offered a line management position, and was appointed Chief of the Quantum Physics Division in 1985.

== Leadership in NBS and NIST ==
The mid 1980s was a period of rapid organizational change for NBS. This culminated in the passage of the Omnibus Trade and Competitiveness Act of 1988 by which the National Bureau of Standards was renamed to the National Institute of Standards and Technology. This transition was preceded and followed by major internal changes in NBS and NIST, in which Gebbie played key roles.

Gebbie was inducted into the Senior Executive Service in 1987 and was appointed Acting Director of the Center for Basic Standards (CBS) the following year. In 1990, CBS merged with other Centers to form the Center for Atomic, Molecular and Optical Physics (CAMOP), with Gebbie as its director. In 1991, CAMOP was absorbed into a new organization, the Physics Laboratory (PL), again with Gebbie as Director.

Thus, during the course of six years, Gebbie had gone from a position of no managerial responsibility, to one of supervising about ten employees, and eventually to one with responsibility for several hundred employees. One issue that she encountered immediately as PL Director was the future of a free-electron laser project that had just lost its funding from the U.S. Department of Defense. She chose to terminate both the project and its performer, the NIST Radiation Source and Instrumentation Division, as well as the NIST Nuclear Physics Group. These actions were unusually decisive by the standards of NIST organizational culture, and they displaced of a number of NIST employees. However, Gebbie defended her actions effectively, stating that she believed in the full funding of top-priority programs, and would avoid responding to financial exigencies by making "across-the board" reductions.

Gebbie was soon seen to be following this practice with reasonable consistency, and with a number of high-profile successes. She was also intensely active and successful in seeking recognition of PL staff by internal promotion and advancement, NIST awards and honors, and external awards. The PL line managers emulated her example. The most visible outcomes of this approach are the four Nobel Prizes in Physics awarded to PL staff:

- William Daniel Phillips (1997), "for development of methods to cool and trap atoms with laser light"
- Eric Allin Cornell (2001), "for the achievement of Bose-Einstein condensation in dilute gases of alkali atoms, and for early fundamental studies of the properties of the condensates"
- John L. Hall (2005), "for [his] contributions to the development of laser-based precision spectroscopy, including the optical frequency comb technique"
- David J. Wineland (2012), "for ground-breaking experimental methods that enable measuring and manipulation of individual quantum systems"

These were the first, and as of 2016, remain the only Nobel Prizes awarded to the staff of NIST/NBS since its foundation in 1901. In each case, the work that was recognized was performed entirely at NIST, and virtually all of it was done under Gebbie's authority.

Gebbie was intensely interested and active in promoting careers in science for women and minorities. She started the Summer Undergraduate Research Fellowship (SURF) program in PL in the early 1990s. It has since become a NIST-wide activity, bringing over 100 undergraduate students to NIST each summer. Gebbie served for many years in the Working Group on Women in Physics of the International Union of Pure and Applied Physics. She endowed scholarships with her own funds for women graduate students in physics at the University of Colorado Boulder and the University of Maryland, College Park, and was well known within NIST and professional societies for her personal mentoring of women scientists. The honors and awards listed below reflect recognition of those aspects of her career.

The Physics Laboratory had notable longevity as a NIST organization, as did Gebbie as a Laboratory Director. After some significant early restructuring, PL maintained the same general form and executive leadership for 20 years, until a global reorganization of NIST in 2011.

A list of major scientific, technical and program achievements of PL is beyond the scope of the present article. Their extent is indicated in the list of honors and awards below. Three major new organizations created at NIST are due in considerable part to Gebbie's initiative.

- The Center for Nanoscale Science and Technology (CNST), a new NIST Laboratory, was founded upon the core of the Electron Physics Group, which had previously been part of PL. Gebbie was an enthusiastic proponent of CNST and transferred significant PL resources to help establish it.
- The Joint Quantum Institute (JQI), a cooperative research institute of NIST and the University of Maryland, is located on the University's College Park campus. Founded in 2006 after extensive planning and negotiation overseen by Gebbie, it has become one of the world's premiere research centers in quantum science.
- The NIST Physical Measurement Laboratory

== Physical Measurement Laboratory ==
In 2011, Gebbie was appointed Director of NIST Physical Measurement Laboratory (PML), a new NIST laboratory resulting from a NIST-wide reorganization. Primarily a merger of PL and the NIST Electronics and Electrical Engineering Laboratory, PML is more than twice the size of PL and has a more diverse range of programs. Its establishment involved a considerable restructuring of the PL Divisions in Gaithersburg, Maryland. However, there seems to have been no termination of employment directly attributable to the reorganization.

After Gebbie's tenure at PML, she continued to be a NIST employee until her death in 2016. She remains an honored figure at NIST and in the scientific community, and a NIST building was named in her honor in December, 2015.

== Death ==
Gebbie died on August 17, 2016, after a number of health issues following an accident in early 2015 while attending the AAAS Annual Meeting in San Jose, CA.

== Honors and awards ==
- Elected Chair, Industrial Science and Technology Section, American Association for the Advancement of Science, 2015
- Fellow, American Academy of Arts and Sciences, 2008
- Distinguished Executive Presidential Rank Award, Senior Executive Service, 2006
- Government Women's Visionary Leadership Award, 2006
- Fellow, American Association for the Advancement of Science, 2005
- Service to America Medal, Career Achievement Award, 2002
- Department of Commerce Gold Medal for Leadership, 2002
- American Physical Society, Division of Atomic, Molecular, and Optical Physics, Recognition of Leadership in AMO Science, 2001
- Washington Academy of Sciences Award for Outstanding Contributions to the Physical Sciences, 2000
- Fellow, Washington Academy of Sciences, 2000
- Women in Science and Engineering (WISE) Lifetime Achievement Award, 1994
- Fellow, American Physical Society, 1994
- National Institute of Standards and Technology Equal Employment Opportunity Award, 1993
- Department of Commerce Gold Medal for Distinguished Achievement, 1990
- Member, Senior Executive Service of the United States of America, 1987
- Fellow, JILA, 1978 - 1990
