= Nanoparticle deposition =

Process of attaching nanoparticles to solid surfaces

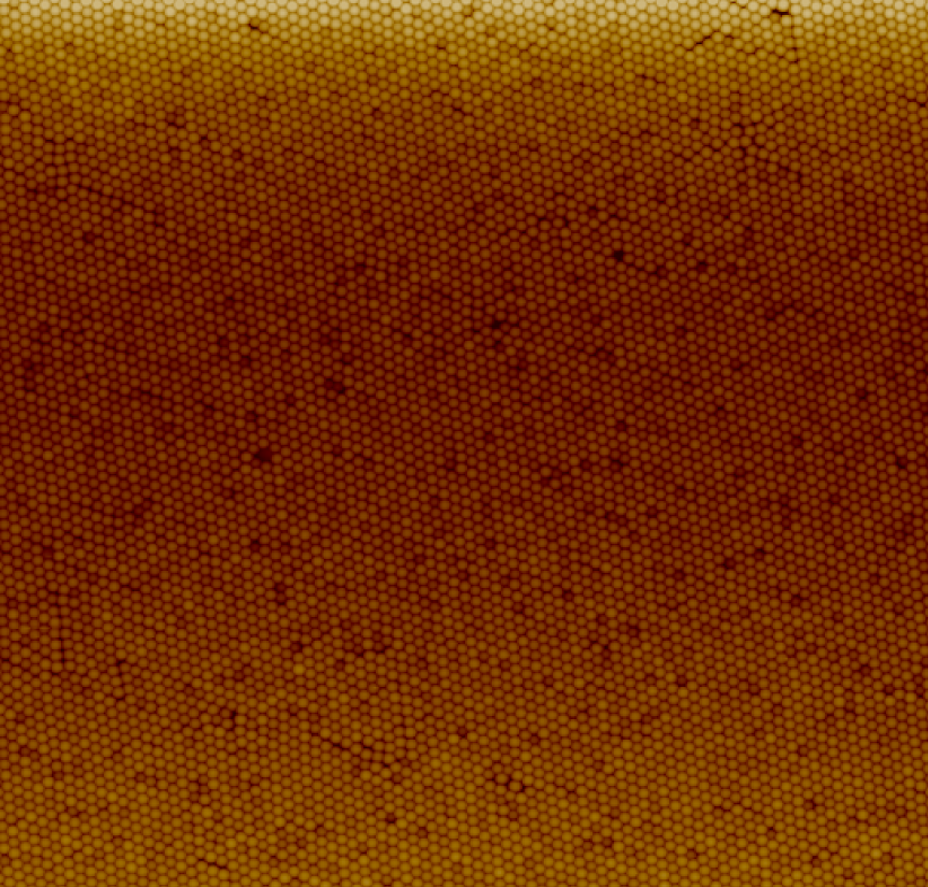
Nanoparticle coating of polystyrene nanoparticles on quartz prepared with the Langmuir-Blodgett method.

Nanoparticle deposition refers to the process of attaching nanoparticles to solid surfaces called substrates to create coatings of nanoparticles. The coatings can have a monolayer or a multilayer and organized or unorganized structure based on the coating method used. Nanoparticles are typically difficult to deposit due to their physical properties.

== Challenges ==
Nanoparticles can be made from different materials such as metals, ceramics and polymers. The stability of the nanoparticles can be an issue as nanoparticles have a tendency to lower their very high surface energy, which originates from their high surface-to-bulk ratio. Bare nanoparticles tend to stabilize themselves either by sorption of molecules from the surroundings or by lowering the surface area through coagulation and agglomeration. Usually the formation of these aggregates is unwanted. The tendency of a nanoparticle to coagulate can be controlled by modifying the surface layer. In a liquid medium, suitable ligand molecules are commonly attached to the nanoparticle surface, as they provide solubility in suitable solvents and prevent coagulation.

== Deposition methods ==
There are multiple different coating methods available to deposit nanoparticles. The methods differ by their ability to control particle packing density and layer thickness, ability to use different particles and the complexity of the method and the instrumentation needed.

=== Langmuir-Blodgett ===
In the Langmuir-Blodgett method, the nanoparticles are injected at air-water interphase in a special Langmuir-Blodgett Trough. The floating particles are compressed closer to each other with motorized barriers which allow to control the packing density of the particles. After compressing the particles to the desired packing density, they are transferred on a solid substrate using vertical (Langmuir-Blodgett) or horizontal (Langmuir-Schaefer) dipping to create a monolayer coating. Controlled multilayer coatings can be made repeating the dipping procedure multiple times.

The benefits of the Langmuir-Blodgett method include a firm control over the packing density and the layer thickness achieved that have been shown to be better than with other methods, the ability to use different shapes and materials of substrates and particles and the possibility to characterize the particle layer during deposition for example a Brewster Angle Microscope. As a disadvantage, a successful Langmuir-Blodgett deposition requires optimization of multiple measurement parameters such as dipping speed, temperature and dipping packing density.

=== Dip coating and spin coating ===
The spin and dip coating methods are simple methods for nanoparticle deposition. They are useful tools especially in creating self-assembled layers and films where the packing density isn't critical. Accurate and vibration-free sample withdrawal speeds can be used to have control over the film thickness. Creating high density monolayers is typically very difficult since the methods are lacking the packing density control. Also, the volume of nanoparticle suspension required for both spin coating and dip coating is rather big which may be an issue when using expensive nanoparticle materials.

=== Other methods ===
Other possible deposition methods include methods utilizing particle self-assembly by solvent evaporation, doctor blade, chemical vapor deposition and transfer printing. Some of these methods like solvent evaporation are extremely simple but produce low-quality films. Other methods such as the chemical vapor deposition are effective for certain types of particles and substrates but are limited in particle types that can be used and require heavier instrumentation investments. Also hybrid methods such as combining self-assembly to Langmuir-Blodgett have been used.

== Nanoparticle coating applications ==
Coatings and thin films made from nanoparticles are being used in various applications including displays, sensors, medical devices, energy storages and energy harvesting. Examples include

- Using graphene oxide for applications in electronics
- Using nanoparticles of metal oxides, carbon nanotubes and quantum dots in photovoltaics, displays and sensors
- Using polymers and nanocomposites in nanolithographic patterning
- Using nanoparticles to scatter light, creating new optical effects

== See also ==
- Langmuir-Blodgett
- Dip coating
- Spin coating
- Nanoparticle
