= Monolayer =

Single closely packed layer of entities such as atoms

A monolayer is a single, closely packed layer of entities, commonly atoms or molecules. Monolayers can also be made out of cells. Self-assembled monolayers form spontaneously on surfaces. Monolayers of layered crystals like graphene and molybdenum disulfide are generally called 2D materials.

== Types ==
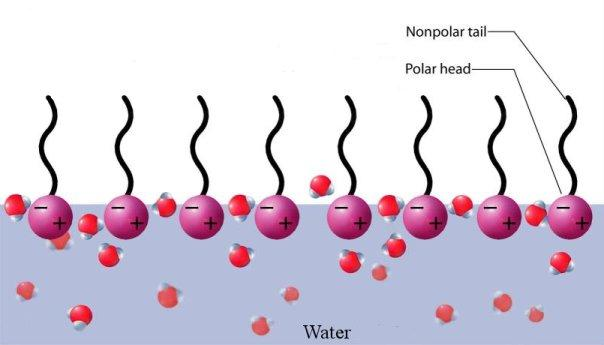
Diagram of ambiphilic molecules floating on a water surface

A Langmuir monolayer or insoluble monolayer is a one-molecule thick layer of an insoluble organic material spread onto an aqueous subphase in a Langmuir–Blodgett trough. Traditional compounds used to prepare Langmuir monolayers are amphiphilic materials that possess a hydrophilic headgroup and a hydrophobic tail. Since the 1980s a large number of other materials have been employed to produce Langmuir monolayers, some of which are semi-amphiphilic, including polymeric, ceramic or metallic nanoparticles and macromolecules such as polymers. Langmuir monolayers are extensively studied for the fabrication of Langmuir–Blodgett film (LB films), which are formed by transferred monolayers on a solid substrate.

A Gibbs monolayer or soluble monolayer is a monolayer formed by a compound that is soluble in one of the phases separated by the interface on which the monolayer is formed.

== Properties ==
=== Formation time ===
The monolayer formation time or monolayer time is the length of time required, on average, for a surface to be covered by an adsorbate, such as oxygen sticking to fresh aluminum. If the adsorbate has a unity sticking coefficient, so that every molecule which reaches the surface sticks to it without re-evaporating, then the monolayer time is very roughly:

$$t = \frac{3 \times 10^{-4} \, \mathrm{Pa} \cdot \mathrm{s}}{P}$$

where t is the time and P is the pressure. It takes about 1 second for a surface to be covered at a pressure of 300 μPa (2×10^{−6} Torr).

=== Monolayer phases and equations of state ===
A Langmuir monolayer can be compressed or expanded by modifying its area with a moving barrier in a Langmuir film balance. If the surface tension of the interface is measured during the compression, a compression isotherm is obtained. This isotherm shows the variation of surface pressure ($\Pi = \gamma^o - \gamma$, where $\gamma^o$ is the surface tension of the interface before the monolayer is formed) with the area (the inverse of surface concentration $\Gamma^{-1}$). It is analogous with a 3D process in which pressure varies with volume.

A variety of bidimensional phases can be detected, each separated by a phase transition. During the phase transition, the surface pressure doesn't change, but the area does, just like during normal phase transitions volume changes but pressure doesn't. The 2D phases, in increasing pressure order:

- Bidimensional gas: there are few molecules per area unit, and they have few interactions, therefore, analogous of the equations of state for 3D gases can be used: ideal gas law $\Pi A = RT$, where $A$ is the area per mole. As the surface pressure increases, more complex equations are needed (Van der Waals, virial...)
- Expanded liquid
- Compressed liquid
- Solid

If the area is further reduced once the solid phase has been reached, collapse occurs, the monolayer breaks and soluble aggregates and multilayers are formed.

Gibbs monolayers also follow equations of state, which can be deduced from Gibbs isotherm.

- For very dilute solutions $\gamma = \gamma_o - mC$, through Gibbs isotherm another analogous of ideal gas law is reached $\Pi = \Gamma R T$
- For more concentrated solutions and applying Langmuir isotherm $\Gamma = \Gamma_{\max} \frac{C}{a+C}$, thus $\Pi = \Gamma_{\max}RT \left(1+\frac{C}{a}\right)$

== Applications ==
Monolayers have a multitude of applications both at the air–water and at air–solid interphases.

Nanoparticle monolayers can be used to create functional surfaces that have for instance anti-reflective or superhydrophobic properties.

Monolayers are frequently encountered in biology. A micelle is a monolayer, and the phospholipid lipid bilayer structure of biological membranes is technically two monolayers. Langmuir monolayers are commonly used to mimic cell membrane to study the effects of pharmaceuticals or toxins.

== Cell culture ==
In cell culture, a monolayer refers to a layer of cells in which no cell is growing on top of another, but all are growing side by side and often touching each other on the same growth surface.

== See also ==
- Langmuir–Blodgett film
- Langmuir–Blodgett trough
- Self-assembled monolayer
- Evaporation suppressing monolayers
