= SEEC microscopy =

Optical quantitative imaging technique

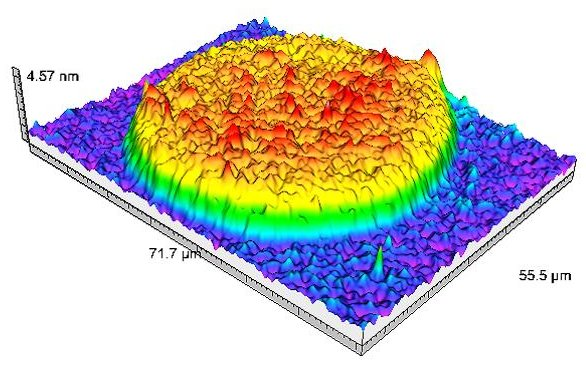
3D Sarfus image of a DNA biochip.

Surface-enhanced ellipsometric contrast microscopy (SEEC) uses an upright or inverted optical microscope in a crossed polarization configuration and specific supporting plates called surfs on which the sample is deposited for observation. It is described as an optical nanoscopy technique.

SEEC relies on precise control of the reflection properties of polarized light on a surface, improving the axial sensitivity of an optical microscope by two orders of magnitude without reducing its lateral resolution. Applications could include real-time visualization of films as thin as 0.3 nanometers and isolated nano-objects in air and in water.

== Principles ==
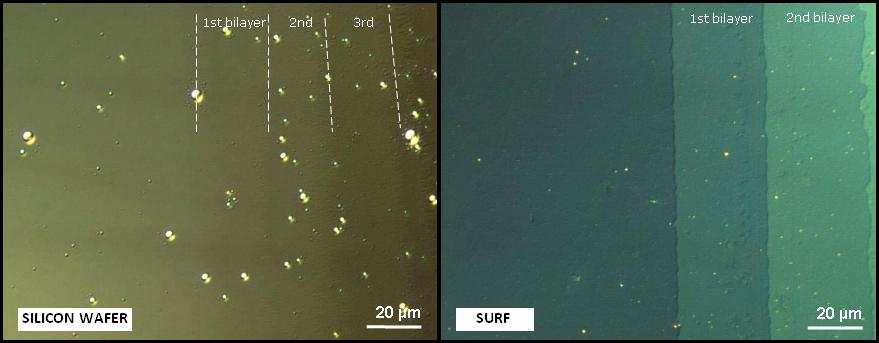
Observation with standard optical microscope between cross polarizers of Langmuir-Blodgett layers (bilayer thickness: 5.4 nm) on silicon wafer and on surf

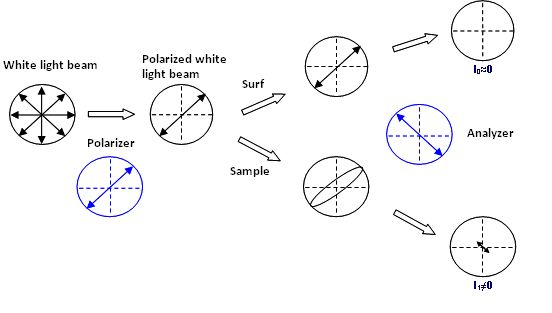
Light polarization after reflection on a surf (0) and on nanoscale sample on a surf (1).

A 2006 study on polarized light coherence led to the development of new supports (the surfs) having contrast amplification properties for standard optical microscopy in cross-polarizer mode. Made of optical layers on an opaque or transparent substrate, these supports do not modify the light polarization after reflection even if the numerical aperture of the incident source is significant. This property is modified when a sample is present on a surf; a non-null light component is then detected after it has been analyzed, rendering the sample visible.

The performance of these supports is evaluated by measuring the contrast (C) of the sample defined as: C = (I_{1}-I_{0})/(I_{0}+I_{1}) where I_{0} and I_{1} represent the intensities reflected by the bare surf and by the analyzed sample on the surf, respectively. For a one nanometer-film thickness, the surfs display a contrast 200 times higher than on silicon wafer.

This high contrast increase allows the visualization with standard optical microscope of films with thicknesses down to 0.3 nanometers, as well as nano-objects (down to a 2 nanometer diameter) and this, without any kind of sample labeling (neither fluorescence, nor a radioactive marker). An illustration of the contrast enhancement is in the Figure for optical microscopy between cross polarizers of a Langmuir-Blodgett structure on a silicon wafer and on a surf.

== Applications ==
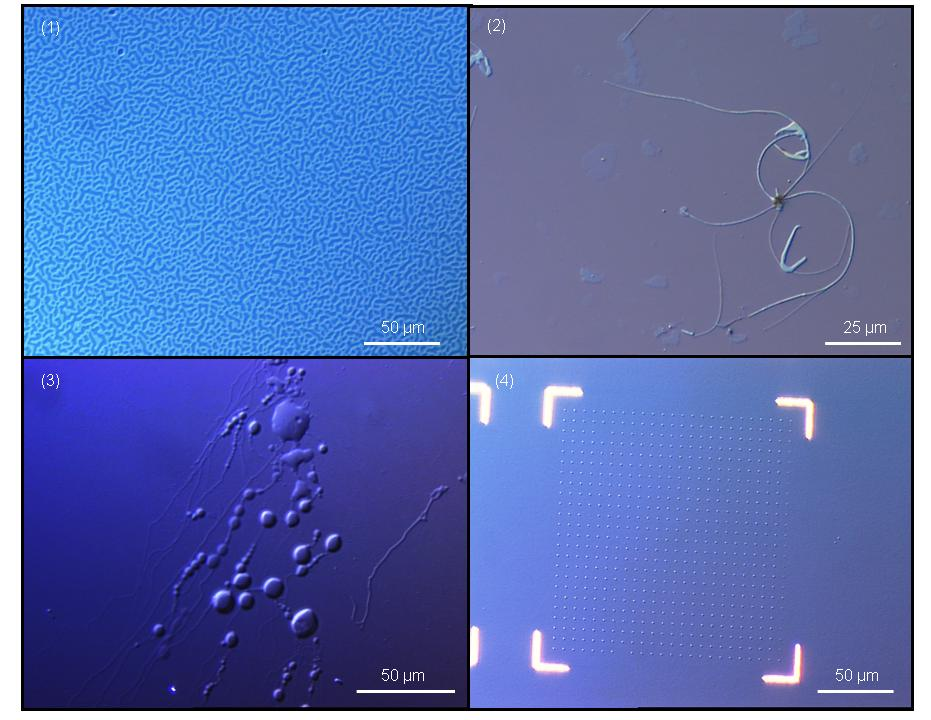
Sarfus images of nanostructures: 1. Copolymer film microstructuration (73 nm), 2. Carbon nanotube bundles, 3. Lipid vesicles in aqueous solutions, 4. Nanopatterning of gold dots (50 nm^{3}).

=== Life sciences ===
- Biological films
- Biochips
- Soft lithography

=== Thin films and surface treatment ===
- Langmuir-Blodgett films

=== Nano-materials ===
- Nanoparticles
- Graphene

== Commercial applications ==
Nanolane's Sarfus Mapping Station is based on surface-enhanced ellipsometric contrast microscopy.
