= Brewster's angle =

Angle of incidence for which all reflected light will be polarized

An illustration of the polarization of light that is incident on an interface at Brewster's angle.

Brewster's angle (also known as the polarization angle) is the angle of incidence at which light with a particular polarization is perfectly transmitted through a transparent dielectric surface, with no reflection. When unpolarized light is incident at this angle, the light that is reflected from the surface is perfectly polarized. The angle is named after the Scottish physicist Sir David Brewster (1781–1868).

== Explanation ==
When light encounters a boundary between two media with different refractive indices, some of it is usually reflected as shown in the figure above. The fraction that is reflected is described by the Fresnel equations, and depends on the incoming light's polarization and angle of incidence.

The Fresnel equations predict that light with the p polarization (electric field polarized in the same plane as the incident ray and the surface normal at the point of incidence) will not be reflected if the angle of incidence is

$$\theta_\mathrm{B} = \arctan\!\left(\frac{n_2}{n_1}\right)\!,$$

where n_{1} is the refractive index of the initial medium through which the light propagates (the "incident medium"), and n_{2} is the index of the other medium. This equation is known as Brewster's law, and the angle defined by it is Brewster's angle.

The physical mechanism for this can be qualitatively understood from the manner in which electric dipoles in the media respond to p-polarized light. One can imagine that light incident on the surface is absorbed, and then re-radiated by oscillating electric dipoles at the interface between the two media. The polarization of freely propagating light is always perpendicular to the direction in which the light is travelling. The dipoles that produce the transmitted (refracted) light oscillate in the polarization direction of that light. These same oscillating dipoles also generate the reflected light. However, dipoles do not radiate any energy in the direction of the dipole moment. If the refracted light is p-polarized and propagates exactly perpendicular to the direction in which the light is predicted to be specularly reflected, the dipoles point along the specular reflection direction and therefore no light can be reflected. (See diagram, above)

With simple geometry this condition can be expressed as

$$\theta_1 + \theta_2 = 90^\circ,$$

where θ_{1} is the angle of reflection (or incidence) and θ_{2} is the angle of refraction.

Using Snell's law,

$$n_1 \sin \theta_1 = n_2 \sin \theta_2,$$

one can calculate the incident angle θ_{1} = θ_{B} at which no light is reflected:

$$n_1 \sin \theta_\mathrm{B} = n_2 \sin(90^\circ - \theta_\mathrm{B}) = n_2 \cos \theta_\mathrm{B}.$$

Solving for θ_{B} gives

$$\theta_\mathrm{B} = \arctan\!\left(\frac{n_2}{n_1}\right)\!.$$

The physical explanation of why the transmitted ray should be at $90^\circ$ to the reflected ray can be difficult to grasp, but the Brewster angle result also follows simply from the Fresnel equations for reflectivity, which state that for p-polarized light

$$R_\mathrm{p} = \left|\frac{n_1 \cos \theta_2 - n_2 \cos \theta_1}{n_1 \cos \theta_2 + n_2 \cos \theta_1}\right|^2,$$

The reflection goes to zero when

$$n_2 \cos \theta_1 = n_1 \cos \theta_2$$

We can now use Snell's Law to eliminate $\theta_2$ as follows: we multiply Snell by $n_1$ and square both sides; multiply the zero-reflection condition just obtained by $n_2$ and square both sides; and add the equations. This produces

$$n_1^4 \sin^2 \theta_1 + n_2^4\cos^2\theta_1 = n_1^2n_2^2 \sin ^2\theta_2 + n_1^2n_2^2 \cos^2 \theta_2 = n_1^2n_2^2 = n_1^2n_2^2 \sin^2 \theta_1 + n_1^2n_2^2 \cos^2 \theta_1$$

We finally divide both sides by $n_1^4\cos^2\theta_1$, collect terms and rearrange to produce $\tan^2\theta_1 = n_2^2/n_1^2$, from which the desired result follows (which then allows reverse proof that $\theta_1 + \theta_2 = 90^\circ$).

For a glass medium (n_{2} ≈ 1.5) in air (n_{1} ≈ 1), Brewster's angle for visible light is approximately 56°, while for an air-water interface (n_{2} ≈ 1.33), it is approximately 53°. Since the refractive index for a given medium changes depending on the wavelength of light, Brewster's angle will also vary with wavelength.

The phenomenon of light being polarized by reflection from a surface at a particular angle was first observed by Étienne-Louis Malus in 1808. He attempted to relate the polarizing angle to the refractive index of the material, but was frustrated by the inconsistent quality of glasses available at that time. In 1815, Brewster experimented with higher-quality materials and showed that this angle was a function of the refractive index, defining Brewster's law.

Brewster's angle is often referred to as the "polarizing angle", because light that reflects from a surface at this angle is entirely polarized perpendicular to the plane of incidence ("s-polarized"). A glass plate or a stack of plates placed at Brewster's angle in a light beam can, thus, be used as a polarizer. The concept of a polarizing angle can be extended to the concept of a Brewster wavenumber to cover planar interfaces between two linear bianisotropic materials. In the case of reflection at Brewster's angle, the reflected and refracted rays are mutually perpendicular.

For magnetic materials, Brewster's angle can exist for only one of the incident wave polarizations, as determined by the relative strengths of the dielectric permittivity and magnetic permeability. This has implications for the existence of generalized Brewster angles for dielectric metasurfaces.

== Applications ==
While at the Brewster angle there is no reflection of the p polarization, at yet greater angles the reflection coefficient of the p polarization is always less than that of the s polarization, almost up to 90° incidence where the reflectivity of each rises towards unity. Thus reflected light from horizontal surfaces (such as the surface of a road) at a distance much greater than one's height (so that the incidence angle of specularly reflected light is near, or usually well beyond the Brewster angle) is strongly s-polarized. Polarized sunglasses use a sheet of polarizing material to block horizontally-polarized light and thus reduce glare in such situations. These are most effective with smooth surfaces where specular reflection (thus from light whose angle of incidence is the same as the angle of reflection defined by the angle observed from) is dominant, but even diffuse reflections from roads for instance, are also significantly reduced.

Photographers also use polarizing filters to remove reflections from water so that they can photograph objects beneath the surface. Using a polarizing camera attachment which can be rotated, such a filter can be adjusted to reduce reflections from objects other than horizontal surfaces, such as seen in the accompanying photograph (right) where the s polarization (approximately vertical) has been eliminated using such a filter.

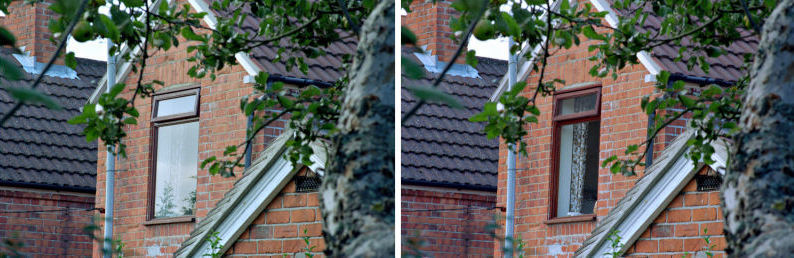
Photographs taken of a window with a camera polarizer filter rotated to two different angles. In the picture at left, the polarizer is aligned to pass only the vertical polarization which is strongly reflected from the window. In the picture at right, the polarizer has been rotated 90° to eliminate the heavily polarized reflected sunlight, passing only the p (horizontal in this case) polarization.

When recording a classical hologram, the bright reference beam is typically arranged to strike the film in the p polarization at Brewster's angle. By thus eliminating reflection of the reference beam at the transparent back surface of the holographic film, unwanted interference effects in the resulting hologram are avoided.

Entrance windows or prisms with their surfaces at the Brewster angle are commonly used in optics and laser physics in particular. The polarized laser light enters the prism at Brewster's angle without any reflective losses.

In surface science, Brewster angle microscopes are used to image layers of particles or molecules at air-liquid interfaces. Using illumination by a laser at Brewster's angle to the interface and observation at the angle of reflection, the uniform liquid does not reflect, appearing black in the image. However any molecular layers or artifacts at the surface, whose refractive index or physical structure contrasts with the liquid, allows for some reflection against that black background which is captured by a camera.

=== Brewster windows ===
A Brewster window

Gas lasers using an external cavity (reflection by one or both mirrors outside the gain medium) generally seal the tube using windows tilted at Brewster's angle. This prevents light in the intended polarization from being lost through reflection (and reducing the round-trip gain of the laser) which is critical in lasers having a low round-trip gain. On the other hand, it does remove s polarized light, increasing the round trip loss for that polarization, and ensuring the laser only oscillates in one linear polarization, as is usually desired. And many sealed-tube lasers (which do not even need windows) have a glass plate inserted within the tube at the Brewster angle, simply for the purpose of allowing lasing in only one polarization.

== Pseudo-Brewster's angle ==
When the reflecting surface is absorbing, reflectivity at parallel polarization (p) goes through a non-zero minimum at the so-called pseudo-Brewster's angle.

== See also ==
- Brewster angle microscope
- Critical angle, the angle of total internal reflection.
