= Katharine Burr Blodgett =

American physicist (1898–1979)

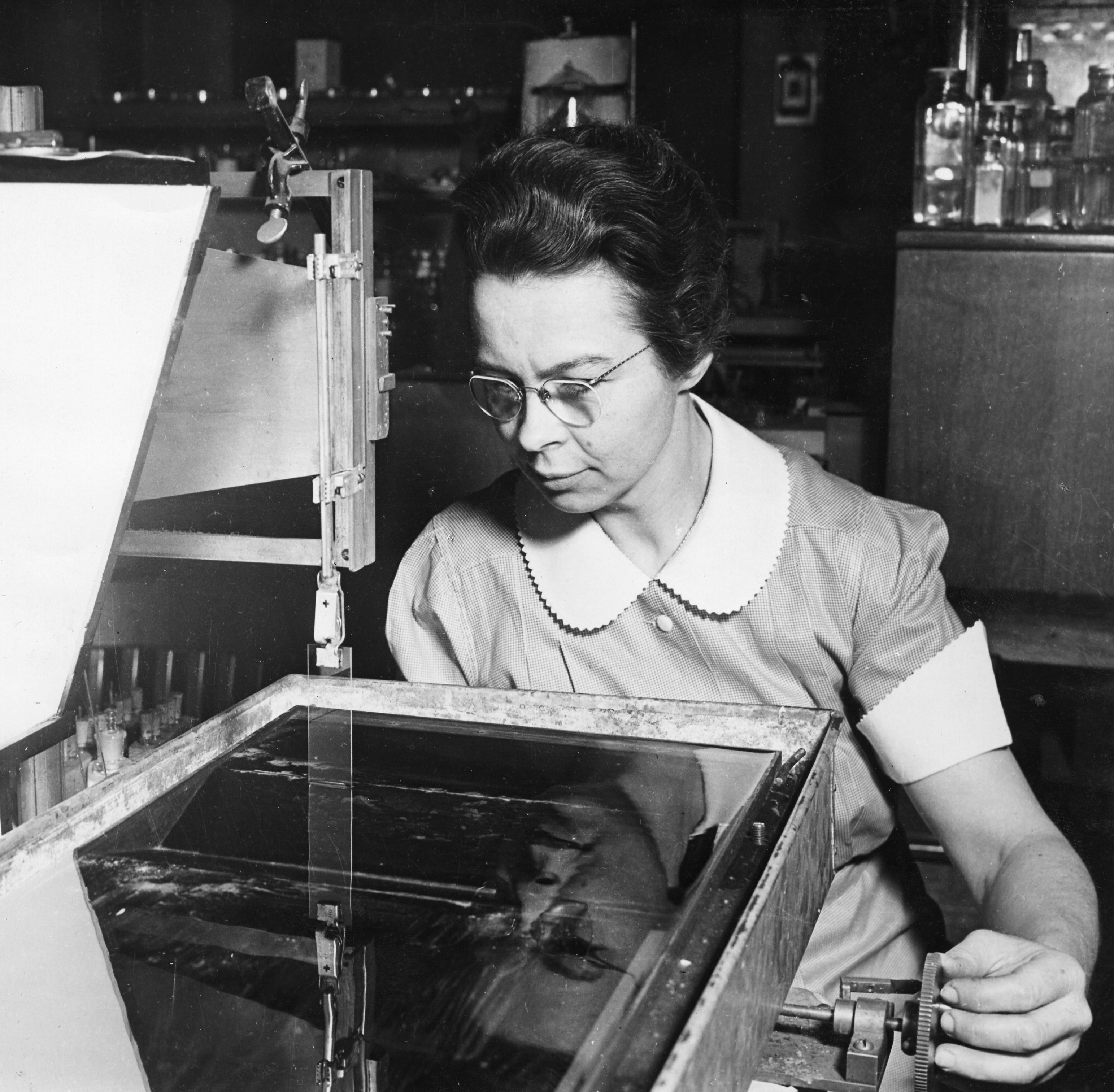
- Blodgett demonstrating equipment in lab, 1938
- Born: January 10, 1898; Schenectady, New York, U.S.
- Died: October 12, 1979 (aged 81); Schenectady, New York, U.S.
- Education: Bryn Mawr College (BA in Physics, 1917); University of Chicago (MS, 1918); Newnham College, Cambridge University (PhD in Physics, 1926)
- Occupations: Physicist; inventor; chemist
- Employer: General Electric
- Known for: Surface chemistry; Anti-reflective coating; Langmuir–Blodgett film; Langmuir–Blodgett trough
- Parents: George Blodgett (father); Katharine Burr (mother)
- Relatives: Katharine Blodgett Gebbie (niece)
- Awards: Garvan–Olin Medal (1951); National Inventors Hall of Fame

Katharine Burr Blodgett (January 10, 1898 – October 12, 1979) was an American physicist and chemist known for her advances in surface chemistry. Among her inventions is the world’s first non-reflecting glass – an advancement that has impacted everything from eyeglasses and microscopes to submarine periscopes and spy cameras in World War II to projectors and cameras in the movie industry and today’s nanotechnology.

She was one of the first women hired as a scientist at General Electric Laboratories. in 1918, and in 1926 became the first woman to be awarded a PhD in Physics from the University of Cambridge (working with Sir Ernest Rutherford). Blodgett held eight patents and received many awards including the Francis Garvan Medal from the American Chemical Society and a posthumous induction to the National Inventors Hall of Fame. Recognizing Blodgett’s advances in commercial applications of physics and in interface science, The Royal Society of Chemistry, the Society of Chemical Industry, and the Institute of Physics have named awards in her honor.

In her discovery of the technique to create non-reflecting or “invisible” glass, Blodgett worked with Irving Langmuir. Together they developed the Langmuir-Blodgett technique, which involves transferring a single layer of molecules from a liquid surface to a solid surface. The result is a one-molecule-thin film, which is the precise width to cancel out the reflection of glass. This technique and resulting film, both named for Blodgett and Langmuir, continue to serve advances in materials science and nanotechnology.

== Early life ==
Blodgett was born on January 10, 1898, in Schenectady, New York. She was the second child of Katharine Buchanan (Burr) and George Reddington Blodgett. Her father was a patent attorney who led patent legal operations for General Electric. Her father was killed in the family’s home by a burglar just before Katharine was born, and General Electric offered a $5,000 reward for the arrest and conviction of the killer. A suspect who was in custody hanged himself in his jail cell in Salem, New York, and no one was ever convicted of the crime.

After Katharine was born, her mother moved with her and her older brother George Jr. to New York City. They spent Blodgett’s early childhood living between New York and Europe, moving to France in 1901, then Saranac Lake, New York, and then Germany. In 1907 they returned to New York City where Blodgett attended The Rayson School for Girls, a small, private school that emphasized math and science education.

== Education ==
In 1913, a 15-year-old Blodgett entered Bryn Mawr College on a scholarship. She focused her studies on math and physics, inspired in particular by two professors, mathematician Charlotte Angas Scott and physicist James Barnes. While at Bryn Mawr, Blodgett achieved more than academic success, participating in a wide range of extracurricular activities. She served as manager of her class’s track team during all four years of college, played water polo during her sophomore year, managed the water polo team during her junior year, was assistant manager of the school’s newspaper, served as treasurer of her class’s senior yearbook, participated in the college’s chess tournament, acted as treasurer and secretary of the Science Club, and as treasurer of the Christian Association. She graduated from Bryn Mawr in 1917.

In 1917, during Blodgett’s senior year of college, Irving Langmuir, a former colleague of her father and future Nobel laureate, gave her a tour of General Electric (GE)’s research laboratories. He offered her a research position at GE on the condition she complete a higher level of education. So, after graduating from Bryn Mawr, she enrolled in a master’s degree program at the University of Chicago and received her Master’s degree in 1918. While there she studied gas adsorption with Harvey B. Lemon. In connection with the government’s Chemical Warfare Service, she conducted research on the chemical structure of the charcoal filter used in gas masks, in particular how charcoal absorbs the relative mixtures of oxygen and nitrogen – information which was vital to protecting soldiers during World War I. Due to wartime censorship, her paper on this work was not published until after the War.

After receiving her Master’s Degree, Blodgett returned to GE to work full-time with Langmuir as a research scientist. After six years, in 1924, with Langmuir’s support, she enrolled in a doctoral program in physics, helping her secure one of the few positions available for women at the Cavendish Laboratory at Cambridge University’ Newnham College. She studied with Nobel Prize winning physicist Sir Ernest Rutherford, focusing on the behavior of electrons in mercury vapor. Her doctoral thesis, “A Method of Measuring the Mean Free Path of Electrons in Ionized Mercury Vapor,” led to improved methods for the vaporization of oil, which enabled more efficient smoke screening during World War II. In 1926 Blodgett became the first woman to receive a PhD in physics from Cambridge University, and Philosophical Magazine published the information from her doctoral thesis under her name.

== Work at General Electric ==
Blodgett was hired as a research scientist in 1918 after receiving a master's degree from the University of Chicago. In 1924 she took a two year hiatus to attain her doctorate at the University of Cambridge. She returned to GE in 1926.

At GE, Blodgett worked with Dr. Irving Langmuir. Langmuir had devised a method to build one-molecule-thin films on the surface of water. Together Langmuir and Blodgett expanded this method to different types of molecules, including lipids, polymers, and proteins. Blodgett took this research further, developing a way to transfer these films onto solid surfaces. By repeatedly dipping a metal plate into water covered with a layer of oil, she deposited one molecular layer at a time onto the plate, which enabled her to control the exact thickness of the film on that plate with molecular-level precision. This process became known as the Langmuir-Blodgett (LB) technique and the resulting one-molecule-thin films as Langmuir-Blodgett (LB) films. This was the first process that allowed organic molecules to be assembled in a controlled way.

Blodgett used the LB technique to develop a nonreflecting coating for glass. She built a 44-molecule-thick film from a 50-50 mixture of cadmium arachidate and arachidic acid dissolved in benzene. At that specific thickness, the reflection from the film canceled out light reflected from the glass beneath it. The original cadmium arachidate coatings were too soft for commercial use, but using this method as the backbone other scientists developed harder coatings.

GE announced the invention of nonreflecting glass in December of 1938. Nonreflecting glass had a wide range of practical applications including: camera lenses, eyeglasses, store windows, car windshields, and instrument covers. The 1939 film Gone with the Wind was the first major movie to use the technology, which was a reason for the movie’s extremely clear cinematography.

Prior to her invention of nonreflecting glass, Blodgett also had developed a color gauge that could measure the thickness of any transparent or semi-transparent substance to the precision of less than one millionth of an inch. Previous methods could only measure to the precision of a few thousandths of an inch. She noticed that when she placed stearic acid in water and then placed a plate in the water, the stearic acid coated the plate in layers. As each layer was added, the increasing thickness changed the color. She then created a ruler with a color for each thickness, which allowed for comparing the color of an unknown to that of a known thickness. Her discovery had many practical applications, such as viewing oxide coatings on steel, measuring the swelling of blood corpuscles, and studying antigen activity.

Blodgett and Langmuir also improved the light bulb. They studied the formation of a hydrogen and oxygen film on the tungsten filament of lightbulbs, which set the stage for their later research on monomolecular layers. In addition, their study on the electrical discharges in gases helped lay the foundations for plasma physics.

Another of Blodgett’s inventions was a method to de-ice airplane wings, a substantial advance for WWII pilots. Prior to her discovery, pilots often were grounded during inclement weather. By studying how ice bonds to metal wings and creating a solution to prevent it, WWII pilots could now fly in previously dangerous conditions – an advance that laid the foundational principles for today’s de-icing technologies.

In the early 1950’s, Blodgett devised a semiconductive coating for the inner surface of X-ray tubes and a novel birefringent plastic step gauge. Shortly before her 1963 retirement, she and T. A. Vanderslice published a paper on ionization gauges.

Blodgett published more than thirty scientific papers. Following a long and successful career, she retired from GE in 1963.

== Personal life ==
Blodgett spent most of her adult life in Schenectady, and even bought a home close to the street where she was born. She spent time during the summer at a camp at Lake George in upstate New York, where other General Electric scientists also owned property. Upon her retirement in 1963, colleagues paid tribute to her at a retirement dinner. For much of her adult life, Blodgett was active in the Zonta Club of Schenectady, the local chapter of Zonta International, a network of clubs specifically for professional women. She also maintained a strong connection to her religious beliefs - an interesting juxtaposition with her secular practices that sometimes drew criticism from the more conservative religious community. In her later years, she engaged in communal involvement, gardening, astronomy, and antique collecting. She had roles in the Travelers Aid Society and the General Electric employee’s club and dabbled in theater as an actress in the Schenectady theater group. A colleague described her as having a quick wit and she often wrote poetry.

Blodgett died in her home on October 12, 1979, leaving behind a legacy of innovation and resilience, as she broke barriers for women in science and engineering.

Blodgett’s niece and namesake, astrophysicist Katharine Blodgett Gebbie, also attended Bryn Mawr and in 2015 established a summer research fellowship there in her aunt’s honor. In an interview, Gebbie recalled that on family visits her Aunt Katharine:

"...always arrived with suitcases full of 'apparatus', with which she showed us such wonders as how to make colors by dipping glass rods into thin films of oil floating on water."

Gebbie spoke of her aunt as a role model whose life and work influenced her choice of a career in science.

== Awards and recognition ==
Blodgett received numerous awards during her lifetime. She received a star in the seventh edition of American Men of Science (1943), recognizing her as one of the 1,000 most distinguished scientists in the United States. In 1945, the American Association of University Women honored her with its Annual Achievement Award. In 1951, she received the prestigious Francis Garvan Medal from the American Chemical Society for her work on thin films. That same year, she was chosen by the U.S. Chamber of Commerce as one of fifteen "women of achievement." Also in 1951, she was honored in Boston's First Assembly of American Women in Achievement (the only scientist in the group). On June 13, 1951, the mayor of Schenectady honored her with Katharine Blodgett Day. In 1972, the Photographic Society of America presented her with its Annual Achievement Award.

She received honorary doctorates from Elmira College (1939), Western College (1942), Brown University (1942), and Russell Sage College (1944).

After General Electric announced the development of nonreflecting glass, Blodgett was featured in a number of newspapers and magazines including: Life, Independent Woman, Current Biography, and Chemical and Engineering News. In addition to her scientific accomplishments, the articles noted her diverse interests such as her gardening experiments, her cabin on Lake George, and her roles as president of a professional women’s club and the Travelers Aid Society in Schenectady.

== Legacy ==
Blodgett’s research and invention legacy can be seen in today’s innovations. The Langmuir-Blodgett technique continues to play a role in surface science, materials science, and nanotechnology. Her discovery of nonreflecting glass is now utilized in a wide range of products beyond its original uses, including televisions and computer screens.

Several posthumous honors pay tribute to Blodgett’s legacy. In 1980, the journal Solid Thin Films dedicated an issue to Langmuir-Blodgett films, specifically recognizing Blodgett, and in 2007, she was inducted into the National Inventors Hall of Fame. In 2008, an elementary school in Schenectady was named for her, operating first as a regular elementary school, and then housing the Katharine Burr Blodgett Success Academy, a special middle school program. Budget cuts led to the school closing altogether in 2013. Blodgett’s accomplishments as a woman in science continue to inspire future generations, and she serves as a role model for future scientists.

== Patents ==
Blodgett was issued eight U.S. patents during her career. She is the sole inventor for six of the patents, and two of the patents include a co-inventor, Vincent J. Schaefer.

- U.S. patent 2,220,860 issued November 5, 1940: "Film Structure and Method of Preparation"
- U.S. patent 2,220,861 issued November 5, 1940: "Reduction of Surface Reflection"
- U.S. patent 2,220,862 issued November 5, 1940: "Low-Reflectance Glass"
- U.S. patent 2,493,745 issued January 10, 1950: "Electrical Indicator of Mechanical Expansion" (with Vincent J. Schaefer)
- U.S. patent 2,587,282 issued February 26, 1952: "Step Gauge for Measuring Thickness of Thin Films"
- U.S. patent 2,589,983 issued March 18, 1952: "Electrical Indicator of Mechanical Expansion" (with Vincent J. Schaefer)
- U.S. patent 2,597,562 issued May 20, 1952: "Electrically Conducting Layer"
- U.S. patent 2,636,832 issued April 28, 1953: "Method of Forming Semiconducting Layers on Glass and Article Formed Thereby"

== See also ==
- Notable American Women by the Radcliffe Institute, Harvard University
- Busch-Vishniac, Ilene; Busch, Lauren; Tietjen, Jill (2024). "Chapter 13. Katharine Burr Blodgett". Women in the National Inventors Hall of Fame: The First 50 Years. Springer Nature. ISBN 9783031755255.
