= Dip-coating =

Industrial coating process

A schematic of the continuous dip coating process.: 1. Roll of coarse cloth; 2. Cloth; 3. Bath; 4. Liquid material; 5. Rollers; 6. Oven; 7. Scrapers; 8. Excess liquid falls back; 9. A coating remains on the fabric cloth.

Dip coating is an industrial coating process which is used, for example, to manufacture bulk products such as coated fabrics and condoms and specialised coatings for example in the biomedical field. Dip coating is also commonly used in academic research, where many chemical and nano material engineering research projects use the dip coating technique to create thin-film coatings.

The earliest dip-coated products may have been candles. For flexible laminar substrates such as fabrics, dip coating may be performed as a continuous roll-to-roll process. For coating a 3D object, it may simply be inserted and removed from the bath of coating. For condom-making, a former is dipped into the coating. For some products, such as early methods of making candles, the process is repeated many times, allowing a series of thin films to bulk up to a relatively thick final object.

The final product may incorporate the substrate and the coating, or the coating may be peeled off to form an object which consists solely of the dried or solidified coating, as in the case of a condom.

As a popular alternative to Spin coating, dip-coating methods are frequently employed to produce thin films from sol-gel precursors for research purposes, where it is generally used for applying films onto flat or cylindrical substrates.

== Process ==
The dip-coating process can be separated into five stages:

- Immersion: The substrate is immersed in the solution of the coating material at a constant speed (preferably jitter-free).
- Start-up: The substrate has remained inside the solution for a while and is starting to be pulled up.
- Deposition: The thin layer deposits itself on the substrate while it is pulled up. The withdrawing is carried out at a constant speed to avoid any jitters. The speed determines the thickness of the coating (faster withdrawal gives thicker coating material).
- Drainage: Excess liquid will drain from the surface.
- Evaporation: The solvent evaporates from the liquid, forming the thin layer. For volatile solvents, such as alcohols, evaporation starts already during the deposition and drainage steps.

In the continuous process, the steps are carried out directly after each other.

Many factors contribute to determining the final state of the dip coating of a thin film. A large variety of repeatable dip coated film structures and thicknesses can be fabricated by controlling many factors: functionality of the initial substrate surface, submersion time, withdrawal speed, number of dipping cycles, solution composition, concentration and temperature, number of solutions in each dipping sequence, and environment humidity. The dip coating technique can give uniform, high quality films even on bulky, complex shapes.

== Applications in research ==
The dip coating technique is used for making thin films by self-assembly and with the sol-gel technique. Self-assembly can give film thicknesses of exactly one mono layer. The sol-gel technique creates films of increased, precisely controlled thickness that are mainly determined by the deposition speed and solution viscosity. As an emerging field, nano particles are often used as a coating material. Dip coating applications include:

- Multilayer sensor coatings
- Implant functionalist
- Hydro gels
- Sol-Gel nano particle coatings
- Self-assembled mono layers
- Layer-by-layer nano particle assemblies.

=== Nanoparticle coatings ===
Dip coating have been utilized for example in the fabrication of bioceramic nanoparticles, biosensors, implants and hybrid coatings. For example, dip coating has been used to establish a simple yet fast nonthermal coating method to immobilize hydroxyapatite and TiO_{2} nanoparticles on polymethyl methacrylate.

In another study, porous cellulose nanocrystals and poly(vinyl alcohol) CNC/PVA nanocomposite films with a thickness of 25−70 nm were deposited on glass substrates using dip coating.

=== Sol-gel technique ===
Dip coating of inorganic sols (or so-called sol-gel synthesis) is a way of creating thin inorganic or polymeric coatings. In sol-gel synthesis the speed of deposition is an important parameter that affects, for example, layer thickness, density and porosity.

The sol-gel technique is a deposition method that is widely used in material science to create protective coatings, optical coatings, ceramic coatings and similar surfaces. This technique starts with the hydrolysis of a liquid precursor (sol), which undergoes poly-condensation to gradually obtain a gel. This gel is a bi-phasic system containing both a liquid phase (solvent) and a solid phase (integrated network, typically polymer network). The proportion of liquid is reduced stepwise. The rest of the liquid can be removed by drying and can be coupled with a thermal treatment to tailor the material properties of the solid.

== See also ==
- Nanoparticle deposition
- Sol-gel
- Coatings
