= Yuri Lvov =

Yuri M. Lvov
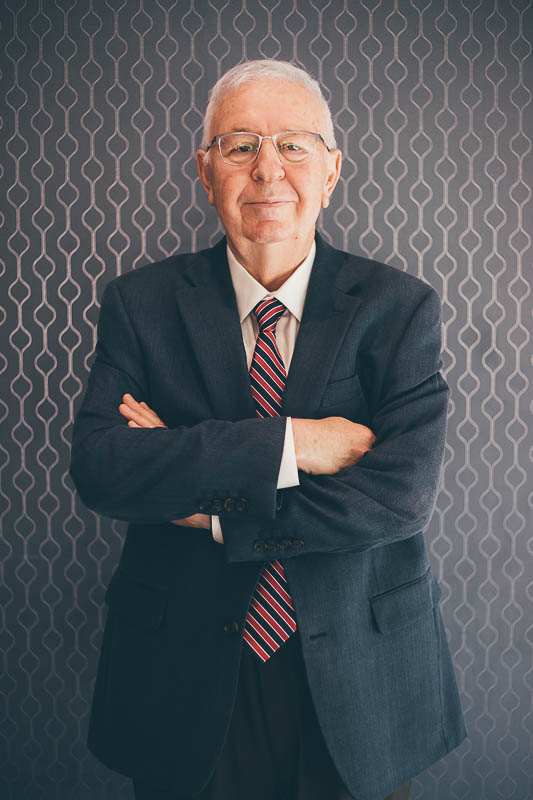
- Lvov in 2025
- Born: Slavgorod, Soviet Union (now Slavgorod, Russia)
- Education: M. V. Lomonosov Moscow State University
- Years active: 1977–present
- Scientific career
- Fields: Nanotechnology; Self-assembly
- Workplaces: Louisiana Tech University (1999–); United States Naval Research Laboratory (1998-99); University of Connecticut (1997-98); Japan Science and Technology Agency (1994–1996); University of Mainz (1991-93); Soviet Academy of Sciences Shubnikov Institute of Crystallography (1980-90)
- Thesis: (1979)
- Doctoral advisor: Lev Feigin (M. V. Lomonosov Moscow State University)
- Website: http://www2.latech.edu/~ylvov/

Yuri M. Lvov is a Russian American scientist and educator. He serves as the Tolbert Pipes Eminent Endowed Chair on Micro and Nanosystems at Louisiana Tech University's Institute for Micromanufacturing. His scientific research has focused on chemistry and physics, with particular emphasis on the areas of micro and nanotechnologies, ultrathin films, and bio/nanocomposites. His work on developing polyelectrolyte layer-by-layer (LbL) assembly has been recognized by the Alexander von Humboldt Foundation with both a fellowship and the Humboldt Research Award in Chemistry, and he has been identified as among the world's foremost experts in exploring the uses of halloysite clay nanotubes for industrial and commercial purposes. Lvov served as a professor in the Soviet Union until its collapse, and then moved to Germany in 1991 to work at the University of Mainz. Following his time in Mainz, Lvov held senior positions with the Japan Science and Technology Agency, the University of Connecticut, and the United States Naval Research Laboratory, before settling at Louisiana Tech University in 1999. He has also worked with the Max Planck Institute of Colloids and Interfaces. Lvov is one of the most cited chemists, with a total citation count exceeding 45,000, and an h-index of 113.

== Early life and education ==
Lvov was born in the Soviet Union in the small town of Slavgorod, located in Siberia. Prior to the Russian Revolution, Lvov's family had been nobles loyal to the Russian Empire and had a small estate in present-day Lithuania. Lvov's great-grandfather Alexei Lvov was the co-author of God Save the Tsar!, the Russian Empire's anthem; his grandfather was a member of the White Guard. Having been on the losing side of the revolution, Lvov's family suffered the political consequences when the Soviets occupied Lithuania in the spring of 1941. Lvov's grandfather, Colonel R. Lvov, was executed. Lvov's grandmother, as well as Lvov's father (who was then 14 years old) were sent to a labor colony in Siberia, where Lvov was born. Following the death of Joseph Stalin in 1953, the Gulag system was slowly dismantled, and Lvov's family was freed. Lvov's father moved to the Ural region, where he received a Doctor of Philosophy degree in Linguistics. Ultimately, Lvov's father relocated to Moscow, where he became a university professor.

In the mid-1960s, when Lvov was a teenager, he became inspired by heroic figures in the science and engineering fields, who were exemplified in the Soviet Union. Due to Soviet achievements in the space race, such as Yuri Gagarin's Vostok 1 flight and other scientific developments during the Cold War, Lvov was particularly interested in physics; he viewed success in this field as a way to rebuild his family's former success. Excelling in his studies, he entered the M. V. Lomonosov Moscow State University, the leading Soviet research university. Lvov graduated in 1974 with a Bachelor of Science degree in physics, and then followed this with a Doctor of Philosophy degree in Physical Chemistry in 1979.

== Career ==
After receiving his Ph.D, Lvov remained in Moscow, becoming a senior researcher and group leader at the Soviet Academy of Sciences Shubnikov Institute of Crystallography. In this role, he studied protein structures and organic thin films, while overseeing the work of graduate students. Lvov held this position from 1980-90. Noteworthy papers published during this period included research on heavy-atom markers in hemoglobin (1980, FEBS Letters), bacteriophage (1983, Biophysical Journal), and X-ray and electron diffraction of Langmuir-Blodgett films (1989, Soviet Scientific Reviews); key collaborators included Boris Vainshtein (head of the Institute of Crystallography).

At the start of the 1990s, Lvov was in his late 30s and had a stable, successful post supported by the government. That all changed with the dissolution of the Soviet Union, which by 1991 was in the midst of collapse. During this time, salaries at the Soviet Academy of Sciences had fallen to unsustainable lows, with academics making less than bus drivers. In early 1991, Lvov, who by this time had achieved recognition outside the Soviet Union, was granted a fellowship by the Alexander von Humboldt Foundation and invited to work at the University of Mainz in Germany. Once in Mainz, Lvov was introduced to Helmuth Möhwald, who at the time was a professor of physical chemistry at the university. Möhwald encouraged Lvov to consider his time in Germany to be akin to a new graduate program, and therefore to expand to new types of research. Together with chemist Gero Decher, Möhwald and Lvov pioneered the concept of layer-by-layer (LbL) self-assembly with a series of highly influential papers published between 1993-94. These included a seminal paper focusing on the use of layer-by-layer assembly with polyallylamine hydrochloride (1993, Langmuir), a follow-up involving layering polyallylamine hydrochloride and DNA (1993, Macromolecules), a paper focusing on nanocomposite films for biosensors (1994, Biosensors and Bioelectronics), and a final paper which demonstrated proof of multilayer structural organization in self-assembled films (1994, Thin Solid Films). This research was foundational for subsequent development and application of LbL assembly, including for use in drug delivery, tissue engineering, fuel cell preparation, and anti-reflection / anti-UV coatings. Lvov, Decher, and Möhwald have subsequently been credited as the developers of layer-by-layer assembly for multicomponent films made up of polyions (such as DNA, RNA, and proteins), as well as other charged materials.

At the end of 1993, Lvov's fellowship at Mainz came to its conclusion, and in 1994 he moved to Japan to work with the Research Development Corporation of Japan (now known as the Japan Science and Technology Agency) in Fukuoka. Lvov served as a staff researcher with the Corporation for two years. During this time, Lvov published his most frequently cited paper: a demonstration of the feasibility of assembling multicomponent biocatalytic films using electrostatic layer-by-layer adsorption, which he co-authored with Katsuhiko Ariga, Izumi Ichinose, and Toyoki Kunitake (1995, Journal of the American Chemical Society). This paper has been cited more than 1,800 times as indexed by Google Scholar. This successful collaboration with Ariga led to the pair subsequently co-authoring more than 30 additional papers together, as well as Lvov being named a collaborative researcher to Japan's National Institute for Materials Science Supermolecules Group, which Ariga leads. Other significant papers produced during Lvov's time in Japan included an exploration of assembling dye−polyion molecular films via layer-by-layer absorption (1997, Journal of the American Chemical Society), and an investigation of layer by layer assembly of colloidal SiO2 particles (1997, Langmuir). Additionally, Lvov, Ariga, Kunitake, and Mitsuhiko Onda were granted two Japanese patents relating to the preparation of ultrathin films. Lvov concluded his time in Japan in 1996, and thereafter immigrated to the United States, where he has conducted the rest of his career.

In 1997, Lvov joined the University of Connecticut as a senior research scientist and adjunct professor, roles he held until 1998. During this time, Lvov focused on facilitating direct electrochemical activation of metabolic enzymes on solid electrodes using the layer-by-layer method. This culminated in a significant paper which provided the first report of direct enzyme voltammetry in layer-by-layer films on electrodes (1998, Journal of the American Chemical Society). From 1998-99, Lvov joined the United States Naval Research Laboratory as a research associate professor specializing in biomolecular science and engineering to address Navy needs such as ship antifouling coating. It was during this time that Lvov first began to consider and introduce research relating to his major research focus: halloysite nanotube composites. While at the Naval Research Laboratory, Lvov collaborated with his former colleague Möhwald to co-edit and contribute a chapter to the book Protein Architecture: Interfacing Molecular Assemblies and Immobilization Biotechnology, a comprehensive work which also included a chapter by Frank Caruso, as well as frequent collaborators Ariga and Kunitake, with whom Lvov had continued to work after his time in Japan (2000, Marcel Dekker).

After leaving the Naval Research Laboratory, Lvov settled at his long-term research institution, Louisiana Tech University, in 1999. Initially serving as an associate professor from 1999-2003, in 2004 Lvov was named as a chemistry professor, as well as the Tolbert Pipes Eminent Endowed Chair on Micro and Nanosystems. During his time at Louisiana Tech University, Lvov continued his focus on layer-by-layer assemblies. In 2006, Lvov was granted a US patent for lithography-based layer-by-layer assembled nanofilms. Two additional patents relating to layer-by-layer formation of papers and wood fibers were granted in 2013 and 2014, Research into nanoparticles yielded a further patent grant in 2014, which focused on stable polyelectrolyte coatings for nanoparticles to enable their usage with medications with poor solubility. However, Lvov's most significant research at Louisiana Tech University involved his expansion into a new field: research of halloysite, a naturally occurring clay material with a hollow nanotubular structure, with which he developed functional nanoclay formulations.

Lvov began exploring halloysite in the year 2000, working with Naval Research Laboratory members Ronald Price and Bruce Garber on two key papers. The first paper focused on in-vitro release characteristics of active agents encapsulated in halloysite (2001, Journal of Microencapsulation). The second paper (co-authored with former colleague Ichinose) focused on halloysite's use in layer-by-layer nanofabrication (2002, Colloids and Surfaces). These papers were the first of more than 90 journal papers, book chapters, and written conference presentations which Lvov authored on halloysite. Lvov's entry into the halloysite research field predates by several years the rise in attention to the aluminosilicate, which prior to 2005 had primarily been considered viable as a replacement for kaolin in ceramics. In subsequent decades, Lvov's initial paper on utilizing halloysite to encapsulate active agents was cited as a pioneering work which enabled the exploration of use of halloysite in medical drug delivery applications. Over the following years, Lvov worked with numerous scientific teams throughout the world to further explore and develop uses for halloysite, particularly in the fields of nanoencapsulation, nanoassembly of ultrathin organized films, and nanocomposites. In 2007, Lvov's work in nanoencapsulation was recognized with the Best of Small Tech Award for Innovator of the Year, an award granted by Small Times Magazine. Also in 2007, Lvov co-edited (with Ariga and others) the book Bio‐inorganic Hybrid Nanomaterials: Strategies, Syntheses, Characterization and Applications, while also contributing a chapter co-written with Price (2007, Wiley-VCH). The following year, Lvov significantly expanded his explorations by analyzing the potential of halloysite nanotubes to be used for the controlled release of active agents over time (2008, ACS Nano). This significant paper, co-authored with Price, Möhwald, and Dmitry Shchukin, established that halloysite nanotubes could be utilized for the sustained release of therapeutic agents, an essential characteristic for use in medicines. In 2008, Lvov's ongoing work with cancer drug nanoencapsulation, a topic he first received notice for in 2002, was highlighted with an extensive cover story in Pharma Focus Asia magazine, where Lvov and his student Anshul Agarwal shared the magazine's cover with other global scientific leaders in the nanoencapsulation field. That same year, Lvov led a joint research project focused on nanocarriers for cancer therapy which was co-organized by Louisiana Tech University and the Istituto Italiano di Tecnologia's Nanotechnology Laboratory; the project was selected as one of 2008's 20 most outstanding scientific joint projects between the US and Italy. In 2010, Lvov's halloysite research further optimized controlled release as described in a paper detailing the use of end stoppers, which could be used to adjust the release timing of contained active agents over a range of tens to hundreds of hours, while also including the ability to start and halt the release (2010, Journal of Materials Chemistry). The next year, Lvov served as the chief organizer and chairman of the Polymer-Clay Nanocomposites Symposium at the Conference of the American Chemical Society; this was one of five American Chemical Society conferences at which he presented, and one of two (the other being 2008) in which he was presented an Award Certificate by the organization. Lvov concluded 2011 by co-editing and writing the preface of a special edition of Advanced Drug Delivery Reviews, as well as contributing three articles to the issue which explored the combination of halloysite and layer-by-layer self-assembly for the creation of nanoshells to contain insoluble medicines, serving as an alternative approach to therapeutic drug delivery.

In 2013, Lvov was recognized with the Alexander von Humboldt Foundation's Humboldt Research Award in Chemistry in acknowledgement of his extensive work in the field of nanochemistry, while in 2014, he was named a National Academy of Inventors Fellow. In 2014, Lvov co-edited the book Cell Surface Engineering: Fabrication of Functional Nanoshells and contributed two chapters, while two of his students contributed to an additional chapter (2014, Royal Society of Chemistry). Two years later, Lvov co-edited another book, Functional Polymer Composites with Nanoclays, while contributing two chapters (2016, Royal Society of Chemistry). In 2024, in acknowledgement of his contributions to the University, Louisiana Tech recognized Lvov with its inaugural Distinguished Research Excellence Award.

In the following years, Lvov's ongoing work with halloysite led to Louisiana Tech University becoming a major contributor of scientific research and discoveries relating to the material. Lvov's students have completed doctoral dissertations on halloysite, and in one case been awarded a fellowship with the United States Environmental Protection Agency. Commercialization efforts have resulted in Lvov being granted a US patent for layer-by-layer nanocoating with halloysite for paper fabrication (2010), a patent for using a halloysite nanotube to form a microreservoir with end plugs for the controlled release of a corrosion inhibitor (2013), a patent for halloysite-based ceramic nanotube composites for use with bone repair and implants (2015), two patents relating to incorporating halloysite into geopolymers to slow their polymerization reaction (2017–18), three patents relating to halloysite's use for the encapsulation of dyes for human hair and natural fibers (2019–20), and two additional patents granted to Lvov and the cosmetics company L'Oréal for the development of a halloysite-based microtube-dye composite for hair coloring (2023–24). Lvov's 2010 work on coatings and manufacturing techniques for paper led to him establishing a small licensing company, Nano Pulp and Paper, to commercialize the technology. In 2013, a joint effort between Lvov and Grambling State University resulted in the development of an experimental anti-corrosion paint for use in oil and gas settings; the companies Cameron International, PPG Industries, and Schlumberger were the commissioning entities. Additional commercial research and applications have included collaborations with Baxter International to develop protein drug encapsulation, with Novartis for eye lens nanocoating, and with Sappi, Smurfit Westrock, and International Paper for the strengthening of paper cellulose.
