= Kristallografija =

Crystallography journal

Kristallografija (Crystallography Reports)
- Discipline: Crystallography
- Language: Russian (English translation)
- Edited by: Mikhail Kovalchuk

Publication details
- Former name(s): Soviet Physics Crystallography
- History: 1956–present
- Publisher: MAIC "Science/Interperiodica" (Russia)
- Frequency: Bimonthly
- Open access: Hybrid
- Impact factor: 0.7 (Crystallography Reports) (2022)

Standard abbreviations
- ISO 4: Kristallografija

Indexing
- Kristallografija (Russian)
- ISSN: 0023-4761
- OCLC no.: 487590094
- Crystallography Reports (English)
- ISSN: 1063-7745 (print); 1562-689X (web)

Links
- Journal homepage; Distributor: Crystallography Reports; Publisher: Crystallography Reports

Kristallografija, also transliterated as Kristallografiya or Kristallografiia, (Russian: Кристаллография) is a bimonthly, peer-reviewed, Russian crystallography journal currently published by MAIC "Science/Interperiodica". An English translation Crystallography Reports is published by Pleiades Publishing, Inc.

== History ==
The journal was founded in 1956 by Alexei Vasilievich Shubnikov and was initially dedicated to the publication of research from the Institute of Crystallography of the Russian Academy of Sciences.

The journal is also available in English translation as Soviet Physics Crystallography ISSN 0038-5638 1956–1992 (volumes 1–37) continued as Crystallography Reports ISSN 1063-7745 1993–present (volumes 38–present). The journal is available in online format ISSN 1562-689X from 2000–present. The current publisher of the translated journal is Pleiades Publishing, Inc., and the distributor is Springer Nature.

The journal was the first to publish papers in the new areas of antisymmetry, polychromatic symmetry, and generalized symmetry.

== Scope ==
The journal publishes original articles, short communications, and reviews on various aspects of crystallography: crystallographic symmetry; theory of crystalline structures; diffraction and scattering of X-rays, electrons, and neutrons, determination of crystal structure of inorganic and organic substances, including proteins and other biological substances; UV–Vis and IR spectroscopy; growth, imperfect structure and physical properties of crystals; thin films, liquid crystals, nanomaterials and ceramics, partially disordered systems, crystallographic methods; instruments and equipment; crystallographic software; history of crystallography; anniversaries; and obituaries.

== Editors ==
- A.V. Shubnikov (1956–1968)
- N.V. Belov (1968–1982)
- B.K. Vainshtein (1982–1996)
- L. A. Shuvalov (1997–2004)
- M.V. Kovalchuk (since 2004)

== Abstracting and indexing ==
Crystallography Reports is abstracted and indexed by the following services.

- Astrophysics Data System (ADS)
- Baidu
- CLOCKSS
- CNKI
- CNPIEC (China National Publications Import Export Corporation)
- Chemical Abstracts Service (CAS)
- Current Contents Physical, Chemical and Earth Sciences
- Dimensions
- EBSCO
- EI Compendex
- FIZ Karlsruhe
- Google Scholar
- INIS Atomindex
- INSPEC
- Japanese Science and Technology Agency (JST)
- Journal Citation Reports/Science Edition
- Naver
- OCLC WorldCat Discovery Service
- Portico
- ProQuest-ExLibris Primo / Summon
- Reaction Citation Index
- SCImago
- SCOPUS
- Science Citation Index Expanded (SCIE)
- TD Net Discovery Service
- UGC-CARE List (India)
- Wanfang
