= Helmuth Möhwald =

German physicist (1946–2018)

Helmuth Möhwald (January 19, 1946 in Goldenöls – March 27, 2018) was a German physicist and founding director of the Max Planck Institute for Colloids and Interfaces in Potsdam. His research focus on molecular interfaces, ultrathin films, coated colloids and capsules, membranes, and nanostructured and functional interfaces. Together with Gero Decher and Yuri Lvov, Möhwald is credited with developing the technique of layer-by-layer assembly for multicomponent films made up of polyions (such as DNA, RNA, and proteins), as well as other charged materials.

== Education and career ==
Möhwald was born in Goldenöls in present-day Zlatá Olešnice in the Czech Republic. He studied physics at the University of Göttingen, where he received his PhD in 1974 under the supervision of Erich Sackmann. He then habilitated at the University of Ulm. After his stay as a postdoc (1974/75) at IBM San Jose, he became a research assistant (1975-1978) at the University of Ulm and research associate (1978-1981) at Dornier Flugzeugwerke. He also became C3 professor for physics (1981-1987) at the Technical University of Munich and C4 professor for physical chemistry (1987-1993) at the University of Mainz.

From 1993 to 2014, Möhwald was a scientific member and director at the Max Planck Institute of Colloids and Interfaces in Potsdam. With his retirement on February 1, 2014, the Interfaces department was closed. He was then active as emeritus and consultant in the Biomaterials department at the institute. He has also been an honorary professor at the University of Potsdam (since 1995), Zhejiang University in Hangzhou (since 2001), Fudan University in Shanghai (since 2004), Soochow University in Sozuou (since 2011) and the Chinese Academy of Sciences (2006). Since 2011 he was a member of the Academia Europaea. He was also Chairman of the Colloid Society (2003-2007) and President of the European Colloid and Interface Society (2002-2003).

== Honors and awards ==
His awards include the Physics Prize of the German Society for Physics (1978), the Liesegang Prize (1998), membership in the Austrian Academy of Sciences, the Overbeek Gold Medal of the European Colloid and Interface Society (2007), the Gay-Lussac–Humboldt Prize (2007), an honorary doctorate from the University of Montpellier (2008), the Wolfgang Ostwald Prize (2009), the Langmuir Lectureship Award from the American Chemical Society (2014), and the Elyuhar-Goldschmidt Award from the Königlich Spanish Society of Chemistry. The "IACIS Lifetime Achievement Award 2018" for his lifetime achievement by the International Association of Colloids and Interface Researchers could only be awarded to him posthumously at the annual conference in Rotterdam in May 2018.
