= Zlatá Olešnice =

Zlatá Olešnice may refer to places in the Czech Republic:

- Zlatá Olešnice (Jablonec nad Nisou District), a municipality and village in the Liberec Region
- Zlatá Olešnice (Trutnov District), a municipality and village in the Hradec Králové Region
