= Lev Aleksandrovich Shuvalov =

Soviet crystallographer and mathematician

- Born: 15 November 1923
- Died: 6 December 2004 (aged 81); Moscow
- Education: Moscow State University, Faculty of Physics
- Known for: Symmetry considerations in ferroelectric phase changes
- Awards: State Prize of the USSR (1975); Federov Prize (1994)
- Scientific career
- Fields: Mathematics, crystallography
- Institutions: Laboratory of Phase Transitions, Shubnikov Institute of Crystallography RAS
- Academic advisors: Alexei Vasilievich Shubnikov

Lev Aleksandrovich Shuvalov (Russian: Шувалов Лев Александрович; 15 November 1923 – 6 December 2004) was a Soviet crystallographer and mathematician. Shuvalov is notable for his work on symmetry considerations in ferroelectric crystal phase changes.

== Career ==
Shuvalov was born on 15 November 1923. In 1941 he entered the army directly from school. Shuvalov participated in the battles of Moscow, Stalingrad and Kursk. He served until the end of the war in 1945 and was awarded the Order of the Red Star.

In 1946 Shuvalov entered Moscow State University to study physics, graduating in 1951. He then worked for the Hydroproject Institute for five years. In 1956 Shuvalov joined the Institute of Crystallography studying under Alexei Vasilievich Shubnikov; he gained his doctorate in 1971. He was then appointed a professor at the Institute of Crystallography. In 1972 Shuvalov created the Laboratory of Phase Transitions of which he was the head for over 20 years.

Shuvalov's work was in the fields of mathematics and crystallography, specifically the use of group theory to analyse the phase changes occurring in ferroelectric and ferroelastic crystals. He published more than 700 papers during his scientific career and held over 20 patents.

Between 1956 and 1974, Shuvalov was a leader in the field of symmetry considerations in the crystallography and crystal physics of ferroelectrics. Shuvalov investigated symmetry changes during ferroelectric, ferroelastic and ferromagnetic phase transitions based on Curie's principle. He established a classification of ferroelectrics based on their crystal symmetry. In the 1980s and 1990s Shuvalov led a team that researched new families of ferroelectrics and antiferroelectrics such as the alkali trihydrosulfates and trihydroselenites. He also discovered a new class of crystals with superionic conductivity (superprotonic conductors).

Shuvalov was editor of Kristallografija from 1997 to 2004. He also served on the editorial boards of international journals such as Condensed Matter News, Crystallography Reviews, Ferroelectrics, Ferroelectrics Letters, and Zeitschrift für Kristallographie.

A special issue of Ferroelectrics was dedicated to Shuvalov in 1989. Shuvalov died on 6 December 2004 in Moscow.

A symposium in honour of the centenary of Shuvalov's birth was held at MIREA – Russian Technological University in 2024.

== Publications ==
Selected publications available in English:

- 1956: Ferroelectric phase transitions and crystal symmetry
- 1960: Ferromagnetic phase transitions and the symmetry of crystals
- 1963: Antisymmetry and its concrete modifications
- 1963: Limit groups of double antisymmetry
- 1964: Crystallographic classification of ferroelectrics, ferroelectric phase transformations and peculiarities of domain structure, and some physical properties of ferroelectrics of the different classes
- 1970: Symmetry aspects of ferroelectricity
- 1988: Modern Crystallography IV: Physical properties of crystals
- List of publications from the Steklov Mathematical Institute

== Awards ==
- Order of the Red Star
- State Prize of the USSR in the field of science (1975): "For a series of works on the crystallography and crystal chemistry of ferroelectrics." See: ru:Laureates of the State Prize of the USSR in the field of science and technology (1967—1975)
- Federov Prize (1994): "For a series of works on the theory of symmetry, phase transitions, piezoelectric and related materials." See: ru:E. S. Federov award
