= Shubnikov =

Shubnikov (masculine, Russian: Шубников) or Shubnikova (feminine, Russian: Шубникова) is a Russian surname. Notable people with the surname include:

- Alexei Vasilievich Shubnikov (1887–1970), Soviet crystallographer and mathematician
- Lev Shubnikov (1901–1937), Soviet experimental physicist

== See also ==
- Shubnikov Institute of Crystallography RAS, Moscow, named in honor of Alexei Vasilievich Shubnikov
