= Magnetic drug delivery =

Magnetic nanoparticle-based drug delivery is a means in which magnetic particles such as iron oxide nanoparticles are a component of a delivery vehicle for magnetic drug delivery, due to the simplicity with which the particles can be drawn to (external) magnetopuissant targets. Magnetic nanoparticles can impart imaging and controlled release capabilities to drug delivery materials such as micelles, liposomes, and polymers.

== Synopsis ==
Molecular magnets (single-molecule magnets) are a platform that incorporates insoluble (toxic) drugs into biocompatible carrier materials, without adding magnetic iron oxide nanoparticles which might adversely affect patients susceptible to iron overdose. The drawbacks in conventional magnetic drug delivery methods can be overcome by switching from typical iron oxide nanoparticles to ones based on molecular magnets, such as Fe(salen)-based "anticancer nanomagnet" with proven cancer-fighting ability. However, insoluble drugs including Fe(salen) also have some inherent drawbacks, such as poor water solubility, loss of magnetic activity in solvents, and potential cytotoxicity when accumulated in tissues and organs.

As an alternative synthetic method of magnetic drug delivery, a "non-iron oxide"-based smart delivery platform has been very recently developed by self-assembly of the Fe(salen) drugs into nano-cargoes encapsulated by a smart polymer, exhibiting bio-safe multifunctional magnetic capabilities, including MRI, magnetic field- and pH-responsive heat-releasing hyperthermia effects, and controlled release.
