= Gero Decher =

German chemist (born 1956)

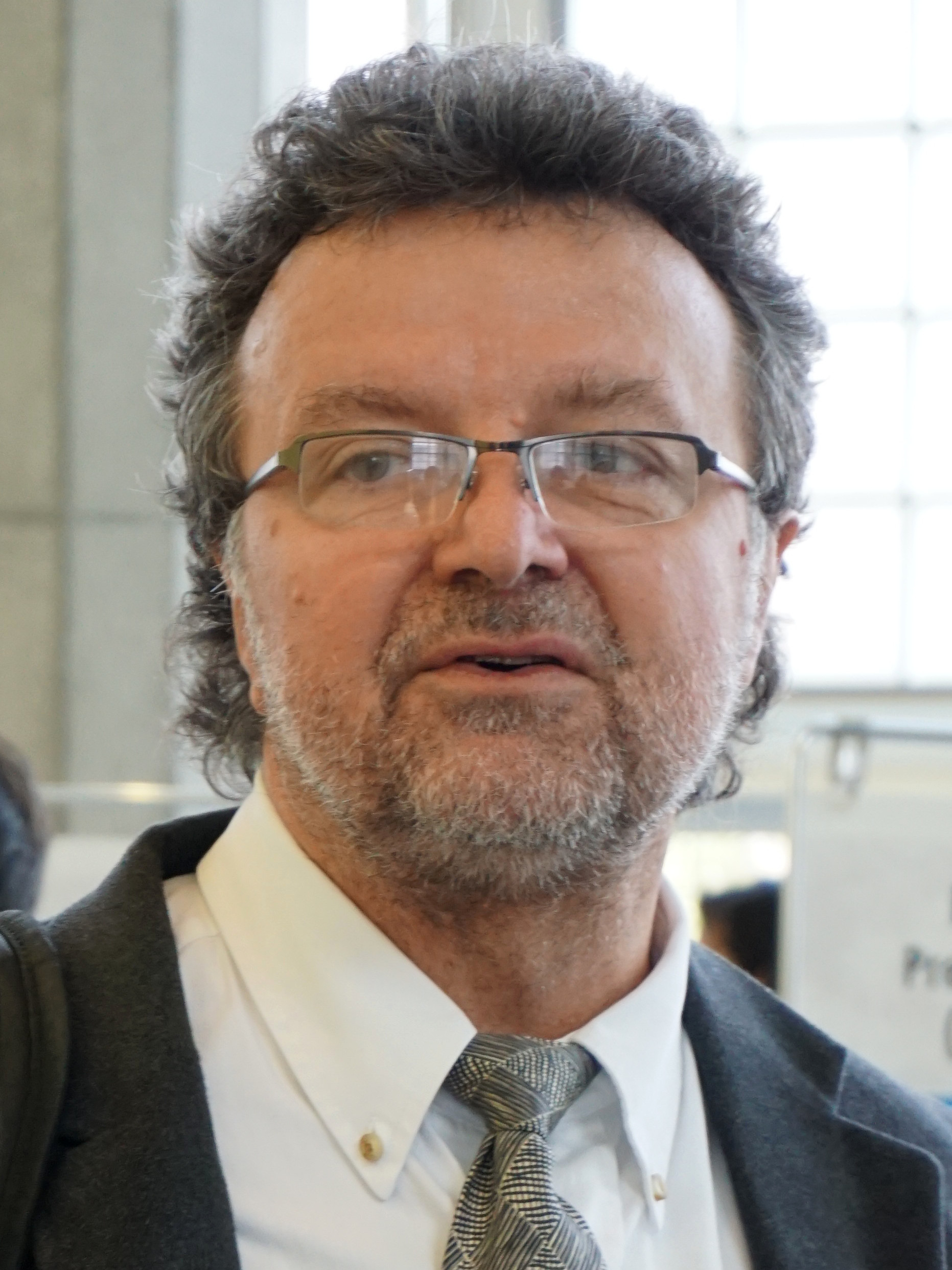
- Decher in 2019
- Born: 1956 (age 69–70); Germany
- Education: Johannes Gutenberg University of Mainz
- Known for: self-assembling materials, layer-by-layer assembly, nanotechnology
- Awards: 2009 Emilia Valori Grand Prix of the Académie des sciences (France) for Nanobiotechnology; 2010 European Colloid & Interface Society–Rhodia European Colloid & Interface Prize; 2013 International Award of the Society of Polymer Science Japan; 2015 Participant of the MEP Scientist Pairing Scheme
- Scientific career
- Fields: Chemistry, Chemical Engineering, Materials Science, Nanotechnology
- Workplaces: University of Strasbourg
- Doctoral advisor: Helmut Ringsdorf
- Website: www.ics-cnrs.unistra.fr/member-160-Decher%20Gero.html

Gero Decher is a German chemist and Distinguished Professor ("Professeur classe exceptionnelle") at the Faculty of Chemistry of University of Strasbourg. He is best known for his seminal role in the development of polyelectrolyte multilayers, which is today known as “layer-by-layer (LbL) assembly”, a simple yet powerful nanofabrication method that has enabled the development of entirely new technologies, such as biocompatible coatings on medical devices, ultrastrong nanocomposites, neural interfaces, charge-storage devices, gas separation, fire retardants, and gene delivery platforms. According to CNRS International Magazine, Decher's work has “sparked a small revolution in materials science”. Layer-by-layer assembly is now an established part of the nanobiotechnology curriculum.

Decher's work on the self-assembly and buildup of multilayer films by alternating application of anionic and cationic components during the early 1990s is generally credited for the revitalization of the layer-by-layer assembly technique and its current prevalence in nanoscience. His 1997 article on “fuzzy nanoassemblies” published in Science Magazine highlighted the potential of layer-by-layer assembly, and was identified by ISI as 8th most cited among all journal articles in chemistry in the decade 1997–2007. This article has been cited over 8000 times as of March 2019.

Over his career, Decher's research has focused on the layer-by-layer assembly method, macromolecules at interfaces, nanocomposite (bio)materials, (bio)functional nanoparticles, functional coatings, thin-film devices and nano-organized multi-materials in general. His current research is centered around the assembly of multi-nanocomposites with complex anisotropies.

== Education and academic career ==
Decher studied chemistry at Philipps Universität, in his hometown of Marburg, Germany. Prior to completing his Diploma thesis with Gernot Boche on the NMR spectroscopy of carbanions, he spent a year working with William Russey at Juniata College in Pennsylvania. In 1986 he obtained his PhD in organic chemistry from Johannes Gutenberg University of Mainz, Germany, working in the laboratory of Helmut Ringsdorf on drug-carrying polymers and lyotropic liquid crystals. He then took up a position as a postdoctoral fellow at Ciba-Geigy AG in Fribourg, Switzerland, where he worked with Bernd Tieke on non-centrosymmetric Langmuir-Blodgett films. From 1988 to 1994 Decher was an Assistant Professor with Helmuth Möhwald at Johannes Gutenberg University of Mainz, where he began his research on the development of layer-by-layer assembly as part of his Habilitation in physical chemistry. From 1994 to 1995 he was Visiting Professor at Université Louis Pasteur in Strasbourg, France, and was promoted to Full Professor of Chemistry in 1995. His research laboratories are located at the CNRS Institut Charles Sadron in Strasbourg, France, where he served as Deputy Director from 2001 to 2009. He was appointed Distinguished Professor by Université Louis Pasteur (now Université de Strasbourg) in 2006.

== Professional achievements ==
Decher is a member of the International Center for Frontier Research in Chemistry (ICFRC) and of the excellence cluster “Nanostructures and their Environment”, both in Strasbourg. He is also a Senior Member of the Institut Universitaire de France (IUF). Further distinctions awarded to Decher include the Emilia Valori Grand Prix of the Académie des sciences (France) for Nanobiotechnology in 2009, the ECIS–Rhodia European Colloid & Interface Prize in 2010, and the International Award of the Society of Polymer Science Japan in 2013. In 2015 he was selected as a participant for the Members of European Parliament Scientist Pairing Scheme, where he was teamed up with a member of the European Parliament.
