= Layer by layer =

Technique for making thin films

Layer-by-layer (LbL) deposition is a thin film fabrication technique. The films are formed by depositing alternating layers of complementary materials with wash steps in between. One of the key advantages of LbL technology compared with other film deposition techniques is its ability to produce highly uniform conformal coatings on both flat and curved surfaces. This can be accomplished by using various techniques such as immersion, spin, spray, electromagnetism, or fluidics.

== Development ==
The first implementation of this technique is attributed to J. J. Kirkland and R. K. Iler of DuPont, who carried it out using microparticles in 1966. The method was later revitalized by the discovery of its applicability to a wide range of polyelectrolytes by Gero Decher at the University of Mainz, with Decher, Helmuth Möhwald, and Yuri Lvov credited for developing LbL assembly for multicomponent films made up of polyions (such as DNA, RNA, and proteins), as well as other charged materials. Nicholas Kotov pioneered the development of biomimetic and high-performance composites through the LbL assembly of nanomaterials such as graphene oxide nanoplatelets.

== Implementation ==
A simple representation can be made by defining two oppositely charged polyions as + and -, and defining the wash step as W. To make an LbL film with 5 bilayers one would deposit W+W-W+W-W+W-W+W-W+W-W, which would lead to a film with 5 bilayers, specifically + - + - + - + - + - .

The representation of the LbL technique as a multilayer build-up based solely on electrostatic attraction is a simplification. Other interactions are involved in this process, including hydrophobic attraction. Multilayer build-up is enabled by multiple attractive forces acting cooperatively, typical for high-molecular weight building blocks, while electrostatic repulsion provides self-limitation of the absorption of individual layers. This range of interactions makes it possible to extend the LbL technique to hydrogen-bonded films, nanoparticles, similarly charged polymers, hydrophobic solvents, and other unusual systems.

The bilayers and wash steps can be performed in many different ways including dip coating, spin-coating, spray-coating, flow based techniques and electro-magnetic techniques. The preparation method distinctly impacts the properties of the resultant films, allowing various applications to be realized. For example, a whole car has been coated with spray assembly, optically transparent films have been prepared with spin assembly, etc. Characterization of LbL film deposition is typically done by optical techniques such as dual polarisation interferometry or ellipsometry or mechanical techniques such as quartz crystal microbalance.

LbL offers several advantages over other thin film deposition methods. LbL is simple and can be inexpensive. There are a wide variety of materials that can be deposited by LbL including polyions, metals, ceramics, nanoparticles, and biological molecules. Another important quality of LbL is the high degree of control over thickness, which arises due to the variable growth profile of the films, which directly correlates to the materials used, the number of bilayers, and the assembly technique. By the fact that each bilayer can be as thin as 1 nm, this method offers easy control over the thickness with 1 nm resolution.

== Applications ==
LbL has found applications in protein purification, corrosion control, (photo)electrocatalysis, biomedical applications, ultrastrong materials, and many more. LbL composites from graphene oxide harbingered the appearance of numerous graphene and graphene oxide composites later on. The first use of reduced graphene oxide composites for lithium batteries was also demonstrated with LbL multilayers.

== See also ==
- Atomic layer deposition
