= Helmut Ringsdorf =

German chemist (1929–2023)

- Born: 30 July 1929; Gießen, Hesse, Germany
- Died: 20 March 2023 (aged 93)
- Education: Technical University of Darmstadt (BSc); University of Freiburg (MSc, PhD)
- Scientific career
- Fields: Polymer chemistry
- Doctoral advisors: Hermann Staudinger, Elfriede Husemann

Helmut Ringsdorf (30 July 1929 – 20 March 2023) was a German polymer chemist. His work promoted cross-disciplinary discussions and collaborations in the field of polymer chemistry, biology, physics and medicine.

Ringsdorf's major research works deal with the self-assembly of polymers into functional aggregates, where 'the whole is more than the sum of its parts'. He is known for being the first to propose covalently bonding drugs to water-soluble polymers.

== Personal life ==
Ringsdorf was born in Gießen, People's State of Hesse in 1929.

Ringsdorf died on 20 March 2023, at the age of 93.

== Education ==
Ringsdorf took undergraduate studies in chemistry, Politics and Geology at the universities at Frankfurt, Darmstadt and Freiburg.

In 1956, Ringsdorf wrote his master's thesis under Hermann Staudinger and, in 1958, wrote his doctoral dissertation under Staudinger and Elfriede Husemann. He was Staudinger's last student.

== Postgraduate work and academic career ==
After completing his doctorate, Ringsdorf served as a teaching assistant in polymer chemistry at the University of Freiburg in 1959. The following year, he worked as a research associate in polymer science at the Polytechnic Institute of Brooklyn in Brooklyn, United States.

Ringsdorf began his independent academic career at the University of Marburg, where he served successively as assistant professor (1962–1967), associate professor (1967–1968), and then professor of polymer science (1969–1970). In 1971, he was appointed professor of organic chemistry at the University of Mainz, a position he held until 1994; he also served as dean of science at Mainz from 1973 to 1975. Alongside his tenured post, he held several adjunct and visiting professorships: adjunct professor of polymer science at Jilin University in Changchun, China (1988–2003); adjunct professor of pharmacy at the University of London (1994–2000); Courtauld Visiting Professor at the University of California, Los Angeles (1995–2000); and adjunct professor of pharmacy at Cardiff University (2001–2005).

== Honors and awards ==
Ringsdorf received numerous honors and awards throughout his career. Early recognition came in 1960 with a Carl Duisberg Fellowship from the Duisberg Foundation in Bonn, followed by the K. Winnacker Award from Farbwerke Hoechst in Frankfurt in 1969. In 1980, he received the H.F. Mark Award for Polymer Science from the Austrian Chemical Society in Vienna, and in 1985, the Hermann Staudinger Award for Polymer Science from the German Chemical Society.

Among his honorary degrees, Ringsdorf received doctorates honoris causa from the Université Paris-Sud (1993), the University of Dublin, Trinity College (1995), and ETH Zurich (1999). In 1993, he was awarded the Chevalier of the Order of the Palmes Académiques in Paris, and in 1994, he received the ACS Award in Polymer Chemistry from the American Chemical Society. That same year he was appointed Rothschild Professor at the Curie Institute in Paris. In 1996 he received the Centenary Lectureship Award from the Royal Society of Chemistry. In 1997, he was named an Eminent Scientist of RIKEN (the Institute of Physical and Chemical Research) in Tokyo. In 2001, he received the Friendship Award of the People's Republic of China.

Ringsdorf also delivered named lectureships at many leading universities and institutions worldwide, including the University of Connecticut, Cornell University, Massachusetts Institute of Technology, Dartmouth College, McGill University, University of Pittsburgh, Weizmann Institute of Science, Kyoto University, University of Washington, Clarkson University, University of California, Berkeley, and the University of Jena, among others.

== Memberships ==
Ringsdorf served on numerous scientific advisory and learned society bodies throughout his career. He was a member of the Foundation Committee of the Alexander von Humboldt Foundation (1971–1976), the Scientific Committee of the German Fonds der Chemie (1976–1979 and again 1990–1993), and the Committee for Scientific Exchange of the DAAD (German Academic Exchange Service) (1976–1989). From 1978 to 1984, he served on the World Health Organization's Committee on Fertility Regulation.

He was elected a member of the Academy of Sciences and Literature in Mainz in 1979, a foreign member of the Academy of Sciences, Berlin (1985–1992), a corresponding member of the North Rhine-Westphalian Academy of Sciences in 1991, and a foreign member of the Russian Academy of Sciences in Moscow in 1999. He also served as a member of the Comité Scientifique in Paris (1989–1994) and as a member of the advisory board of the Conseil National de la Science, Ministère de l'Éducation, de la Recherche et de la Technologie in Paris from 1998.

== Research ==
Ringsdorf's research spanned polymer science as a bridge between materials science and life science.

A major focus of his work was the molecular architecture and functionalization of polymeric liquid crystals, including the synthesis, structure, and properties of liquid-crystalline side-group and main-chain polymers, with variation in the types of mesogens (rods, discs, and boards) and their phases. This included dye-containing and photoreactive liquid-crystalline polymers for reversible information storage and non-linear optic materials, as well as phase induction and variation via charge-transfer interaction and metal complexation.

Ringsdorf also investigated the synthesis, structure, and properties of functional supramolecular systems, working with polymerizable and functional amphiphiles (including detergents and lipids), polymeric monolayers and multilayers formed via the Langmuir–Blodgett technique and via self-assembly on various surfaces, liposomes, black lipid membranes, and multicompartment polymer micelles.

A further area of research concerned attempts to mimic biomembrane processes, involving synthetic and natural receptors in molecular assemblies, molecular recognition, and the two-dimensional crystallization and function of proteins on monolayers and liposomes — including work with lectins, streptavidin, monoclonal antibodies, phospholipase A2, and acetylcholinesterase. He also investigated protein–DNA interaction at ligand lipid monolayers.

His medical applications research addressed polymer therapeutics, polymer radiation prophylactics, and polymeric antitumour agents at both the molecular and cellular level.
