= Self-assembly based manufacturing =

Self-assembly based manufacturing refers to a controlled process of using self-assembly and programmable matter to manufacture a product on an industrial scale. In traditional manufacturing and fabrication, there are physical and precision limitations on a workpiece; namely, lower minimal dimension of a workpiece has been a major challenge in modern manufacturing. Engineering self-assembly methods have a significant potential in overcoming the dimensional limitation of a workpiece. In general, there are three key ingredients in most of self assembly applications: geometry (order), interaction, energy. To improve the efficiency or take shape in self-assembly based manufacturing, it must utilize one or more than one of these three ingredients. This is an emerging market with few examples to date. However, this field shows a strong potential to revolutionize many industrial markets from nanoelectronics to bio-engineering.

== Successful processes ==
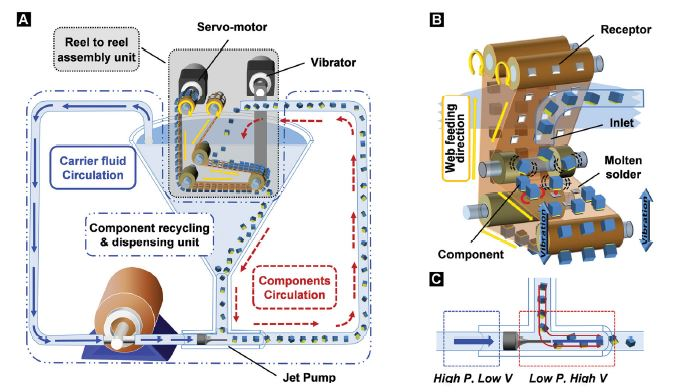
Automated reel to reel fluidic self-assembly machine based on surface-tension-directed-self-assembly.

Many processes have been successfully developed at laboratory scale and show promise for future expansion into large-scale industrial manufacturing.

- Sequence-specific molecular lithography on single DNA molecules
- Direct molecular assembly on metal surfaces
- Amyloid fibers and selective metal deposition: NM protein fibers have been demonstrated to create nanowires useful in connecting electrodes in laboratory testing.
- Surface-tension-directed-self-assembly of electronic components.

One example is the automated reel to reel fluidic self-assembly machine demonstrated by University of Minnesota researchers. The machine was designed to produce lighting panels using Light-emitting diodes. Assembly was performed at twice the hourly rate of commercially available pick and place machines for SMT placement equipment, 15,000 chips per hour compared to 8,000 chips per hour. At the same time, the self-assembly exceeded the accuracy rate of the pick and place machine as well.

== Potential future applications ==
Fabrication of materials used in most extreme environments, such as space, high altitude, free-fall scenarios, or deep sea. environments have advantageous conditions for allowing increase in self assembly interaction with less or minimum energy consumption. Applications in these environments often require high precision and have more difficulties; however, it has less constraints in existing construction.
