= Nicholas A. Kotov =

American chemist (born 1965)

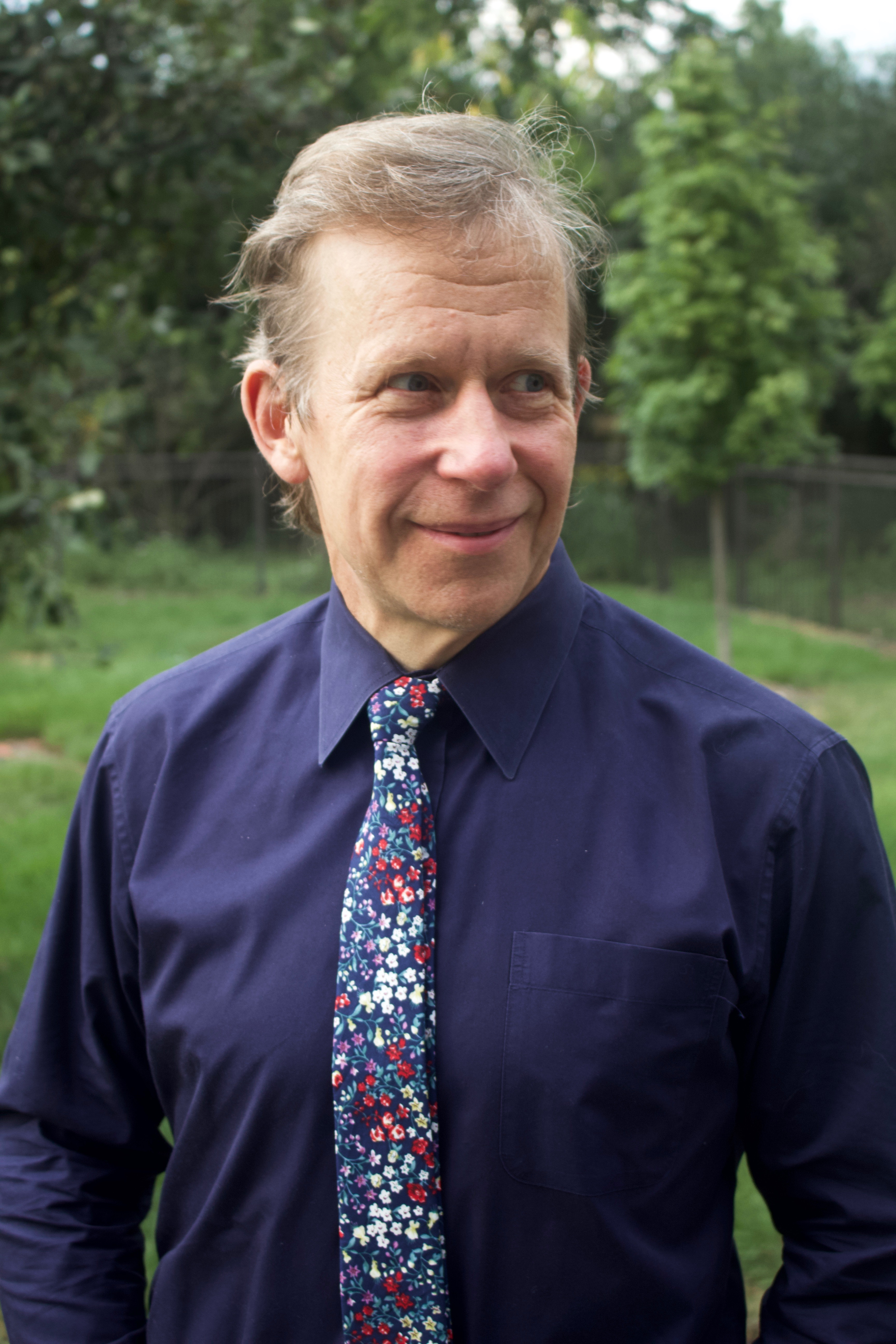
- 2021
- Born: August 29, 1965 (age 61); Moscow, USSR
- Education: Moscow State University
- Known for: self-assembling materials, layer-by-layer assembly, nanotechnology
- Scientific career
- Fields: Chemistry, Chemical Engineering, Materials Science, Nanotechnology, Biomedical Engineering
- Workplaces: University of Michigan
- Thesis: Photoelectrochemical Effects at the Interface of the Two Immiscible Electrolyte Solutions
- Doctoral advisor: Mikhail Kuzmin
- Other academic advisors: Janos H. Fendler

Nicholas A. Kotov (born August 29, 1965, in Moscow, USSR) is the Irving Langmuir Distinguished University Professor of Chemical Sciences and Engineering and the Joseph B. and Florence V. Cejka Professor of Engineering at the University of Michigan in Ann Arbor, Michigan, United States. He is the Director of the National Science Foundation Science and Technology Center for Complex Particle Systems (COMPASS), developing graph-based methods for design of materials essential for sustainability..

Kotov is known for pioneering studies on nanoparticle self-organization, biomimetic materials, and chiral nanostructures. Kotov demonstrated that structurally imperfect inorganic nanoparticles can self-assemble into complex hierarchical structures resembling biological assemblies and materials. He established self-organization as an intrinsic characteristic of nanoscale systems, which contributed to the development of biomimetic composites combining mechanical, optical, and functional properties that are rarely achieved simultaneously in conventional materials. These composite biomimetic materials are exemplified by nacre-like composites from clay and graphene oxide, and cartilage-like membranes from cellulose nanofibrils and aramid nanofibers. Kotov is also known for pioneering chiral nanostructures exhibiting exceptionally strong optical activity.

Materials he developed have enabled sustainable energy devices, green catalysis, and aramid recycling. The chiral plasmonic nanoparticles are being tested for early detection of cancer.

== Work ==
Kotov's research is focused on the development of biomimetic nanocomposites, the self-assembly of nanoparticles, and chiral nanostructures. Utilizing layer-by-layer assembly (LbL), Kotov prepared a wide spectrum of nacre-like nanocomposites including those from clay and graphite oxide. He showed that clay-based biomimetic composites can attain mechanical properties comparable to some grades of steel while retaining transparency. This discovery spurred the development of new methods for the mass-production of nacre-like materials from a large variety of inorganic nanosheets. While being inspired by natural materials, these composites far exceeded the properties of their natural prototypes and add other optical, electrical, thermal, and membrane properties. The Royal Society of Chemistry reported that the socioeconomic impact of Kotov’s work on biomimetic composites exceeded $19 billion as of 2022.

Kotov extended the concept of biomimetic nanostructures to inorganic nanoparticles. He established that, similarly to many proteins and other biomolecules, nanoparticles can self-organize into chains, sheets, nanowires, twisted ribbons and nanohelices, and spherical supraparticles replicating viral capsids.

Kotov's work established that the biomimetic self-assembly behavior of nanoparticles originates from interparticle interactions at the nanoscale, in which chirality also plays a prominent role. His studies on the self-assembly of chiral nanostructures have led to the development of nanoparticle assemblies with complexity exceeding those found in biological organisms.

== Education and research career ==
=== Education and early career ===
Kotov received his MS (1987) and PhD (1990) degrees in chemistry from Moscow State University, where his research concerned liquid-liquid interfaces imitating cell membranes for solar energy conversion. After graduation, he took up a postdoctoral position in the research group of Prof. Janos Fendler in the Department of Chemistry at Syracuse University in New York state working on nanoparticle synthesis and assembly at interfaces.

=== Independent research career ===
Kotov took up a position as assistant professor of chemistry at the Oklahoma State University in Stillwater, Oklahoma in 1996, gaining promotion to associate professor in 2001. In 2003 he moved to the University of Michigan where he is now the Irving Langmuir Distinguished Professor of Chemical Sciences and Engineering.

== Awards ==
- 2025 National Academy of Engineering (NAE, USA)
- 2024 Ray of Hope Prize (Tuebor Energy Inc.,Biomimicry Institute)
- 2024 Centenary Prize and Medal, Royal Society of Chemistry (RSC, UK)
- 2024 Chirality Medal (Daicel and Società Chimica Italiana)
- 2024 Fellow of the American Association for Advancement of Science (AAAS, USA)
- 2023 Frontiers Lecture, Wayne State University
- 2023 Doctor Honoris Causa, University of Vigo
- 2022 American Academy of Arts and Sciences (AAAS, USA)
- 2022 Outstanding Achievement Award in Nanoscience (ACS, USA)
- 2022 Mercator Fellow (Technical University of Dresden, Germany)
- 2021 Thurnbull Lectureship (Materials Research Society)
- 2021 Nanoscale Science and Engineering Forum Award, (American Institute of Chemical Engineers)
- 2020 National Academy of Inventors
- 2020 Alpha Chi Sigma Award (American Institute of Chemical Engineers)
- 2020 Newton Award (Department of Defense)
- 2020 Irving Langmuir Distinguished Professor of Chemical Sciences and Engineering
- 2020 Batsheva de Rothschild Fellowship (The Israel Academy of Sciences and Humanities)
- 2020 Melville Lecturer (University of Cambridge, UK)
- 2019 IMX Lecturer (École Polytechnique Fédérale de Lausanne)
- 2018 Vannevar Bush Fellowship (US Department of Defense)
- 2018 Soft Matter and Biophysical Chemistry Award (Royal Society of Chemistry)
- 2017 Alexander von Humboldt Research Award (Humboldt Foundation)
- 2017 Van 't Hoff Lecturer (Universities of Utrecht, Amsterdam, and Leiden)
- 2017 Colloid Chemistry Award (American Chemical Society, ACS)
- 2016 Stephanie L. Kwolek Award (Royal Society of Chemistry, RSC)
- 2016 August T. Larsson Fellow (Sveriges Lantbruksuniversitet)
- 2016 Senior Fulbright Fellow (Fulbright Foundation and Commission)
- 2016 UNESCO Medal for Development of Nanoscience and Nanotechnologies
- 2014 Materials Research Society Medal (with Prof. S. Glotzer)
- 2014 Best of New Technologies Award (Popular Science)
- 2014 Fellow of the Materials Research Society (MRS)
- 2014 MRL Lecturer (California Institute of Technology)
- 2014 IIN Frontiers in Nanotechnology Lecturer (Northwestern University)
- 2013 Fellow of the Royal Society of Chemistry (RSC)
- 2013 Langmuir Lectureship Award (American Chemical Society, ACS)
- 2012 Stine Award for Materials Research (American Institute of Chemical Engineers, AIChE)
- 2012 Kennedy Family Research Team Award (UM)
- 2011 Top 100 Materials Scientists in 2000-2010 (Thomson Reuters)
- 2011 Top 100 Chemists in 2000-2010 (Thomson Reuters)
- 2008 Gutenberg Award (Government of Alsace)
- 2008 College Inventor Award (USPTO, Kauffman Foundation of Entrepreneurship)
- 2008 Top 10 Discoveries of the Year (Wired Magazine)
- 2007 College of Engineering Research Excellence Award (University of Michigan)
- 2007 Caddell Award (University of Michigan)
- 2007 Chair of Gordon Research Conference "Supramolecular Chemistry" (GRC)
- 2006 Welliver Fellow (The Boeing Co.)
- 2006 Gran Prix, Materials Research Society Entrepreneurship Challenge (MRS)
- 2003 Chair of Gordon Research Conference "Thin Organic Films" (GRC)
- 1998 NSF CAREER Award (National Science Foundation, NSF)
- 1996 Humboldt Fellowship (Humboldt Foundation, Germany)
- 1987 Honor Diploma (diploma with distinction = summa cum laude, Moscow State U.)
- 1986 Mendeleev Fellowship (Moscow State University, Russia)

== Personal life ==
Kotov married chemist Elvira Stesikova, PhD, in 1991. They have two daughters, Sophia and Nicole.
