= Mesocrystal =

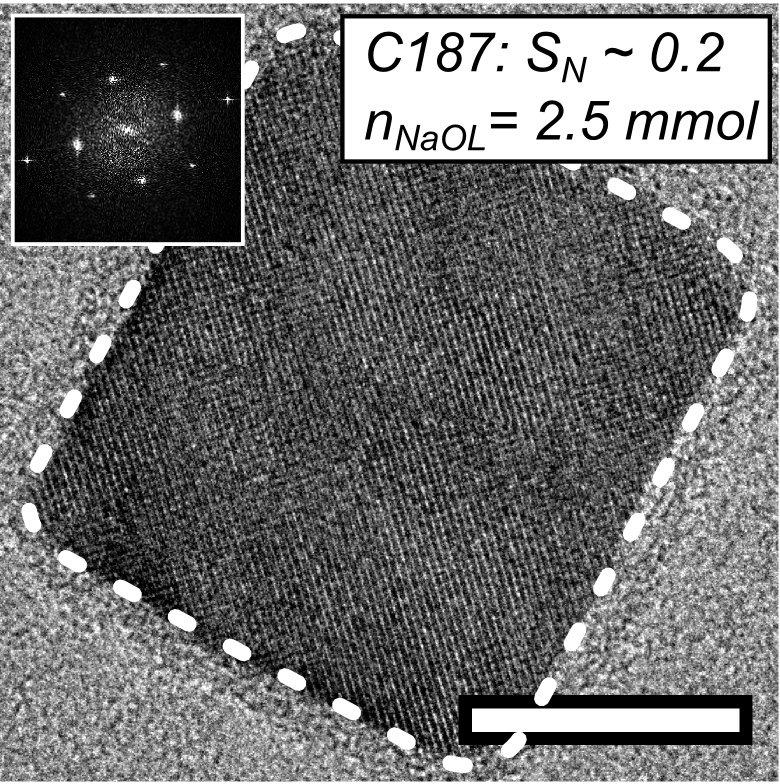
High-resolution electron microscopy image of a single gamma phase iron oxide nanoparticle. Each dot in the image suggest the position of an iron (III) ion. Left inset is the corresponding Fast Fourier transform of the image. Scale bar: 10 nm.

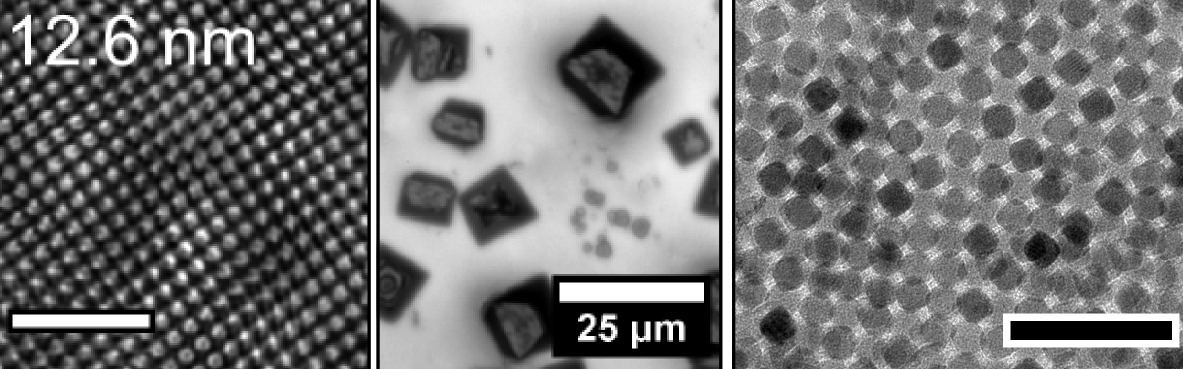
Nanosized iron oxide crystals coated with oleic acid can be dispersed in an organic solvent (toluene). Upon its evaporation, they regularly arrange ("self-assemble", left and right panels) into micron-sized mesocrystals (center) or a multilayer (right). Each dot in the left image suggest the position of a nanoparticle (compare to a traditional "atomic" crystal shown in the image above). Scale bars: 100 nm (left), 25 μm (center), 50 nm (right).

A mesocrystal is a material structure composed of numerous small crystals of similar size and shape, which are arranged in a regular periodic pattern. It is a form of oriented aggregation, where the small crystals have parallel crystallographic alignment but are spatially separated.

When the sizes of individual components are at the nanoscale, mesocrystals represent a new class of nanostructured solids made from crystiallographically oriented nanoparticles. The sole criterion for determining whether a material is mesocrystal is the unique crystallographically hierarchical structure, not its formation mechanism.

== Discovery ==
In 2003, Helmut Cölfen and Stephen Mann described how the self-assembly and crystallization of nanoscale building blocks could produce hierarchically organized crystalline structures. Cölfen later coined the term"mesocrystals" in 2005 during his studies on biominerals. He suggested that their growth was due to a non-classical, self-assembly based process.

== Structure and formation ==
Mesocrystal is an abbreviation for mesoscopically structured crystal, where individual subunits often form a perfect 3D order, as in a traditional crystal where the subunits are individual atoms.

=== Formation methods ===
==== Nanoparticle alignment by organic matrix ====
This is when a mesocrystal is formed by filling organic matrix compartments with crystalline matter. This crystalline matter would be oriented by the organic matrix. This is the process of biomineralization and this is how mesocrystals are produced in nature.

==== Ordering by physical fields ====
In most cases mesocrystals form nanoparticles in solution. These nanoparticles aggregate and arrange in crystallographic formation, without any additives. The main causes of this ordering are tensorial polarization forces and dipole fields.

==== Mineral bridges ====
Formation with mineral bridges occur with the formation of nanocrystals. Growth is quenched at this stage by the absorption of a polymer into the nanoparticle surface. Now mineral bridges can nucleate at the defect site, within the growing inhibition layer on the nanocrystal. Through this, a new nanocrystal grows on the mineral bridge, and the growth is again stopped by the polymer. This process is repeated until the crystal builds up.

==== Space constraints and self-similar growth ====
This argument for formation of mesocrystals requires only a confined space that the reaction takes place in. As the nanoparticle grow into crystals, they have no choice but to align with each other in such a confined space.

== Applications ==
Mesocrystals have unique structural features and the physical and physiochemical properties that come from that structure have made them become a subject of interest. Mesocrystals are expected to have a role in many different applications. These include heterogeneous photocatalysts, electrodes, optoelectronics, biomedical materials, and lightweight structural materials.

The properties that make mesocrystals viable for future applications are their shared properties with nanoparticulate, mesoporous, and single-crystal materials. Because mesocrystals are made up of nanoparticles, the properties of the nanoparticles themselves are, in some cases, passed to the whole mesocrystal structure. This allows for the practical application of mesocrystals because they are "potentially more stable analogues of nanoparticulate materials." High porosity is generally a quality of mesocrystals, this is the property shared with mesoporous materials. Closed, internal pores are good for thermal and dielectric insulation and the open pores then aid in absorption and could be utilized for medical delivery. Alternatively, a mesocrystal could have its pores filled and then it would be similar to a single-crystal material and have some unusual electronic and optical properties. The diversity of the properties of mesocrystals could allow them to be effectively utilized in many applications.

=== In nature ===
The spines of sea urchins are composed of mesocrystals of calcite nano-crystals (92%) in a matrix of non-crystalline calcium carbonate (8%). This structure makes the spines hard but also shock-absorbing, which special property makes them effective defences against predators. Mesocrystals also appear in the shells of some eggs, coral, chitin, and the shells of mussels.
