= Shubnikov Institute of Crystallography RAS =

A. V. Shubnikov Institute of Crystallography

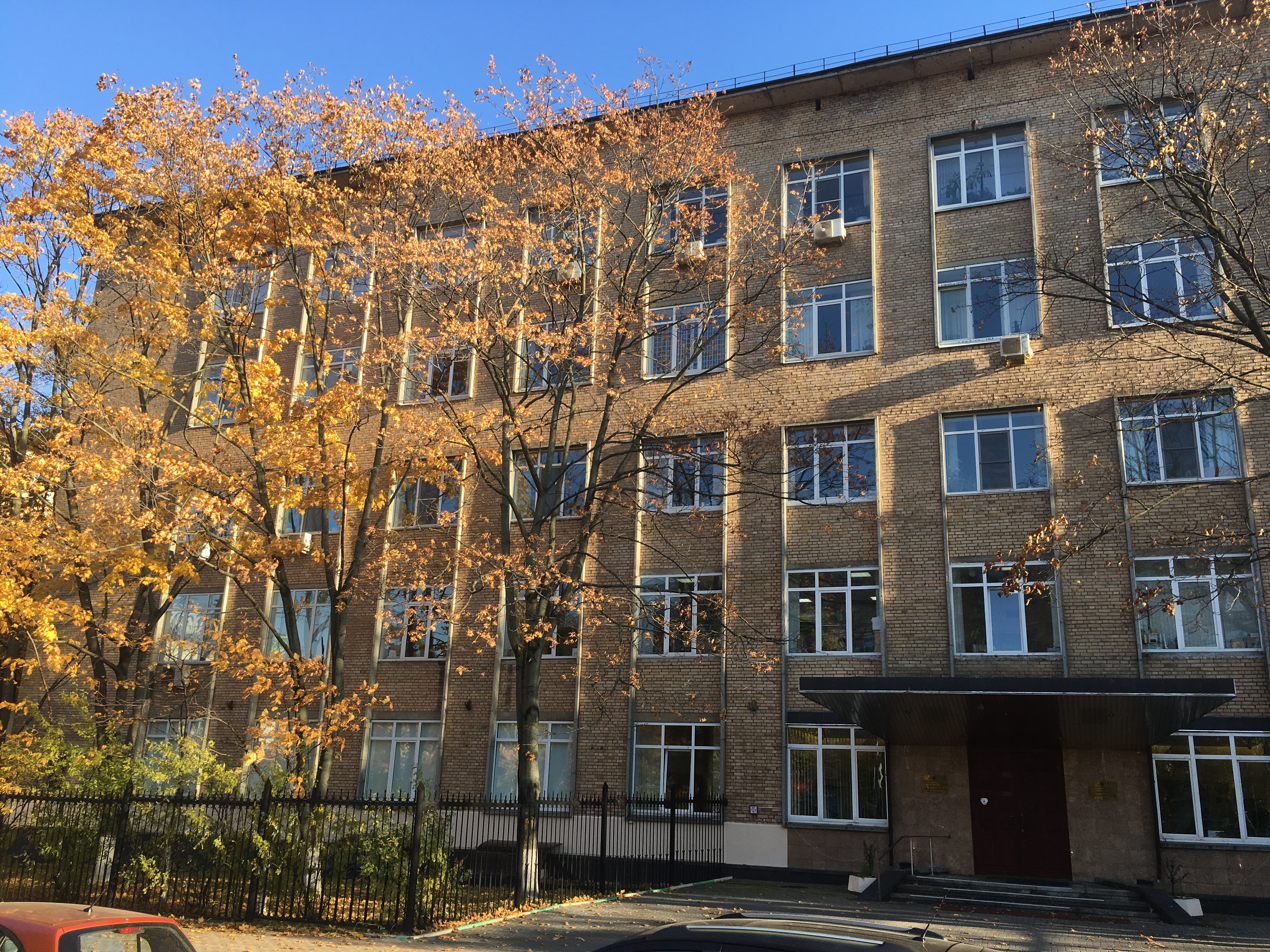
Shubnikov Institute of Crystallography

The A. V. Shubnikov Institute of Crystallography is a scientific institute of the Department of Physical Sciences of the Russian Academy of Sciences (RAS) located in Moscow, Russia. The institute was created by the order of the Presidium of the Academy of Sciences of the USSR on 16 November 1943. The first director of the Institute was a corresponding member of the Academy of Sciences of the USSR Alexei Vasilievich Shubnikov. In 1969, the institute was awarded the Order of the Red Banner of Labour.

Areas of scientific interest:

- Crystal growth: research into crystal formation and growth, development of synthesis methods and creation of equipment for crystallography
- Crystal structure: study of idealialized (theoretical) and real-world crystal structures
- Crystal properties: study of symmetry and physical properties of crystals; search for crystals with valuable properties

== History ==
- 1925 – Laboratory of crystallography at the Mineralogical Museum (Leningrad).
- 1932 – Crystallographic section of the Lomonosov Institute of Geochemistry, Mineralogy and Petrography of the USSR Academy of Sciences.
- 1937 – Crystallographic Laboratory becomes part of the Geological Group of the USSR Academy of Sciences.
- 1941 – During World War II the majority of academic institutes were evacuated from Moscow to the East. The Crystallographic Laboratory continued its work in 1941-43 in the Sverdlovsk Oblast (in the Urals) where a series of important scientific and applied crystallographic problems were solved.
- 1943 – The Laboratory returns to Moscow and is transferred to the Department of Physical and Mathematical Sciences and renamed the Institute of Crystallography.
- 1944 – Organization of the Institute of Crystallography. Alexei V. Shubnikov was appointed Director of the Institute.
- 1956 – Founding of the journal Kristallografiya in which most of the institute's research is subsequently published. This journal is available in English translation as Soviet Physics Crystallography (ISSN 0038-5638) 1956-1992 (vols. 1-37) continued as Crystallography Reports (ISSN 1063-7745) 1993- (vol. 38-)
- 1957 – Recognition outside the USSR of the establishment of the new fields of antisymmetry and colour symmetry by A.V. Shubnikov and N.V. Belov
- 1962 – Boris Vainshtein is appointed Director of the Institute.
- 1969 – Award of the Order of the Red Banner of Labour.
- 1998 – Professor Mikhail Kovalchuk elected Director of the Institute.
- 2016 – The Institute was subsumed within the new «Crystallography and Photonics» Federal Research Center of the Russian Academy of Sciences (KiF RAS) which is now known as the «Crystallography and Photonics» FLNIK.

== Research Fields ==
- Nano- and bio-organic materials: production, synthesis, structure and properties, diagnostic methods using X-ray and synchrotron radiation, electrons, neutrons and atomic force microscopy
- Fundamental aspects of the formation of crystalline materials and nanosystems, their real structure and properties
- Creation and study of new crystalline and functional materials
