= Zlatá Olešnice (Trutnov District) =

- Municipality
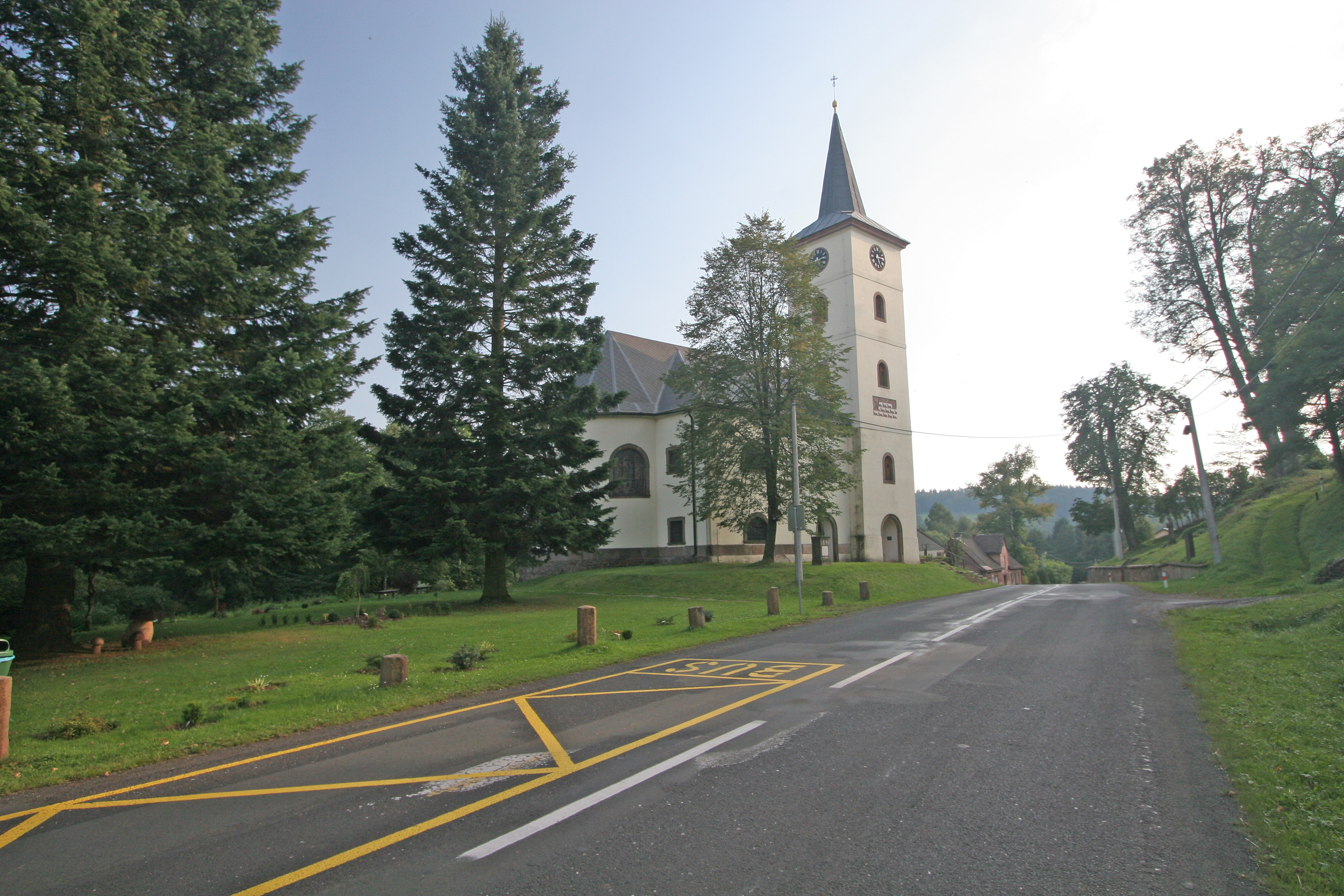
- Church of Saint Catherine

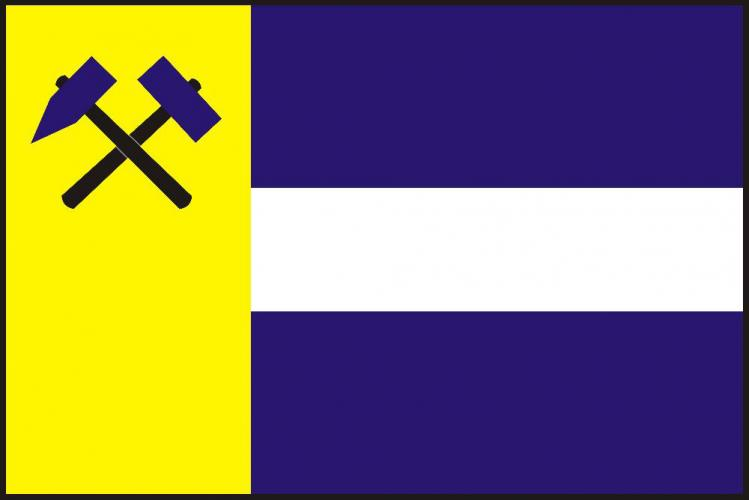
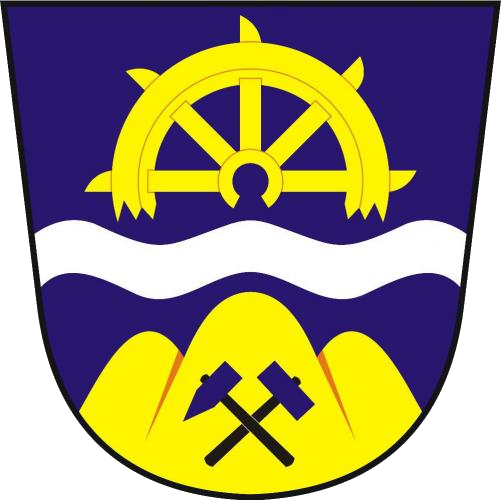
- Flag Coat of arms

- Location in the Czech Republic
- Coordinates: 50°37′4″N 15°56′42″E
- Country: Czech Republic
- Region: Hradec Králové
- District: Trutnov
- First mentioned: 1297

Area
  - Total: 9.43 km^{2} (3.64 sq mi)
- Elevation: 473 m (1,552 ft)

Population (2026-01-01)
  - Total: 211
  - Density: 22.4/km^{2} (58.0/sq mi)
- Time zone: UTC+1 (CET)
  - Summer (DST): UTC+2 (CEST)
- Postal code: 541 01
- Website: www.obec-zlataolesnice.cz

Zlatá Olešnice (German: Goldenöls) is a municipality and village in Trutnov District in the Hradec Králové Region of the Czech Republic. It has about 200 inhabitants.

== Demographics ==
Historical population
Year	Pop.	±%
1869	843	—
1880	756	−10.3%
1890	652	−13.8%
1900	658	+0.9%
1910	683	+3.8%
1921	590	−13.6%
1930	596	+1.0%
1950	248	−58.4%
1961	267	+7.7%
1970	225	−15.7%
1980	184	−18.2%
1991	174	−5.4%
2001	158	−9.2%
2011	187	+18.4%
2021	213	+13.9%
Source: Censuses
