= Boris Vainshtein =

Russian physicist (1921–1996)

Boris Vainshtein

Boris Konstantinovich Vainshtein (Russian: Бори́с Константи́нович Вайнште́йн, 10 July 1921 – 28 October 1996) was a Russian crystallographer. He headed the Laboratory of Protein Crystallography of the Shubnikov Institute of Crystallography RAS, and was the director of the institute, where he spent the majority of his career.

Vainshtein studied at the Lomonosov Moscow State University and the Institute of Steel.

In 1990 Vainshtein won the second IUCr Ewald Prize "for his contributions to the development of theories and methods of structure analysis by electron and X-ray diffraction and for his applications of his theories to structural investigations of polymers, liquid crystals, peptides and proteins".

== See also ==
- Alexei Vasilievich Shubnikov

== Bibliography ==
- Vaĭnshteĭn, B. K. (1964). Structure analysis by electron diffraction. Oxford: Pergamon Press. OCLC 681437461.
- Vainshtein, Boris K. (1966). Diffraction of X-rays by Chain Molecules. Elsevier Science Ltd. ISBN 978-0444405883. OCLC 228652.
- Vainshtein, Boris K. (1995). Structure of Crystals. Vladimir M. Fridkin, Vladimir L. Indenbom (2nd ed.). Berlin, Heidelberg: Springer Berlin Heidelberg. ISBN 978-3-642-97512-7. OCLC 851374965.
- Vainshtein, Boris K. (2000). Modern Crystallography 2 : Structure of Crystals. Vladimir M. Fridkin, Vladimir L. Indenbom (3rd ed.). Berlin, Heidelberg: Springer Berlin Heidelberg. ISBN 978-3-642-57254-8. OCLC 851775417.
- Hargittai, István; Vaĭnshteĭn, B. K.; Udalova, V. V.; Rodin, Ervin Y., eds. (1988). Crystal symmetries : Shubnikov Centennial papers. Oxford: Pergamon Press. ISBN 0-08-037014-4. OCLC 681088683.
