= Mikhail Kovalchuk =

Russian physicist and official (born 1946)

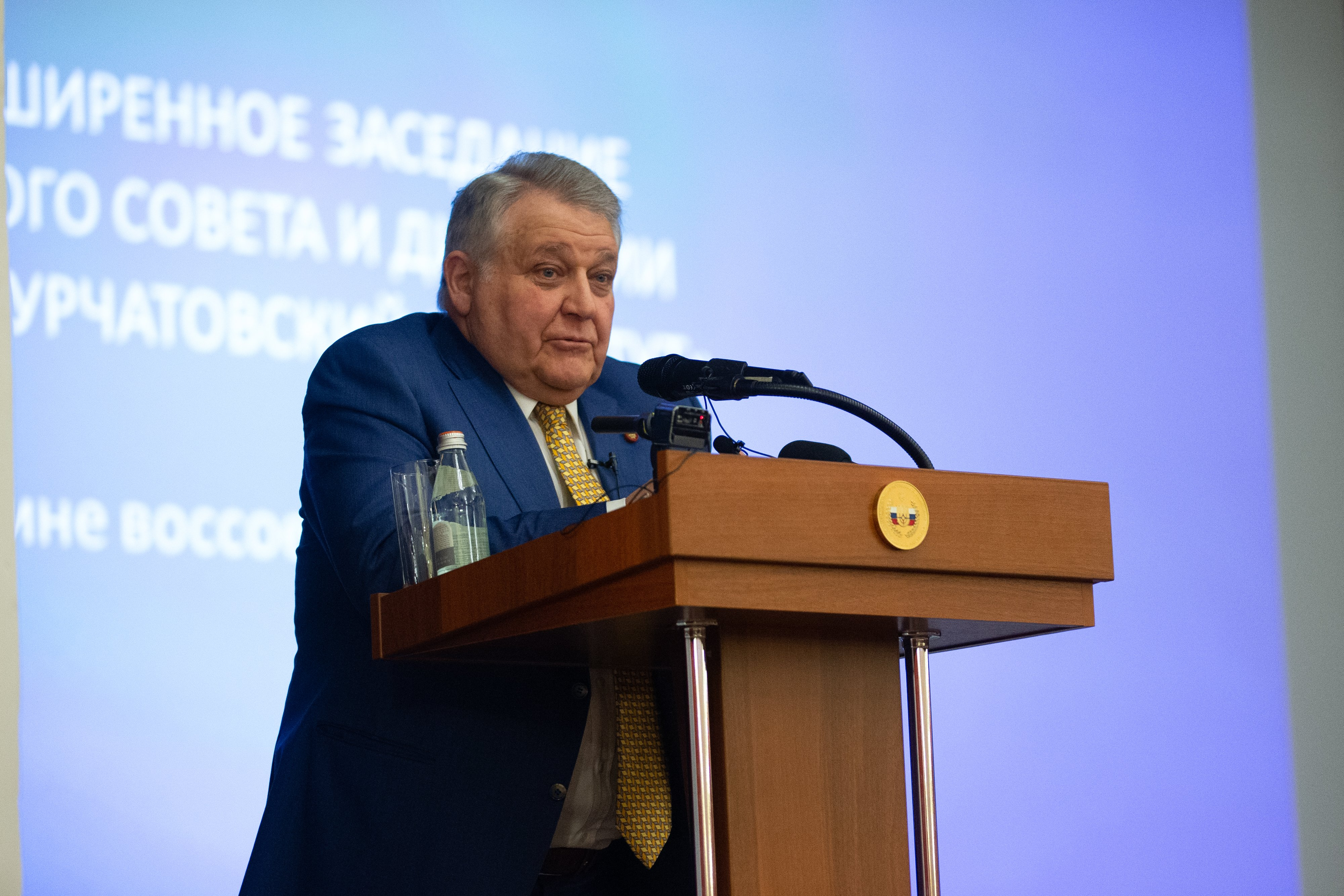
Mikhail Kovalchuk in 2020

Mikhail Valentinovich Kovalchuk (Russian: Михаил Валентинович Ковальчук; born 21 September 1946) is a Russian physicist and official. He is a brother of Yury Kovalchuk, known as "Putin's personal banker".

== Political activity ==
Since May 26, 2000 Mikhail Kovalchuk has been a Corresponding Member of the Russian Academy of Sciences (RAS) in physics.

Since 2001 he has been the Scientific Secretary of the Council for Science and High Technologies attached to the President of the Russian Federation.

Since February 2005 he has been the Director of the Kurchatov Institute.

In June 2007 by a decision of the RAS Presidium Mikhail Kovalchuk was appointed acting vice-president of the Academy for nanotechnology. As the Academy Charter stipulates that only full members are eligible for vice-presidency, Kovalchuk, being a corresponding member, can only be acting vice-president, unless the Charter is modified or he is elected full member.

Despite pressure from Vladimir Putin, the RAS rejected Kovalchuk's application for full membership in May 2008. This was seen as the first major blow to Putin's authority since coming to power in 2000 as there was speculation that Putin had wanted Kovalchuk to become President of the RAS.

In June 2023, he was also appointed President of the Polytechnic Museum.
