= Svet =

Svet may refer to:

- Svet (surname), a family name
- SVET plant growth system, a space greenhouse on the Kristall module of the space station Mir
- Scanning Vibrating Electrode Technique, a scanning probe microscopy technique visualizing local electrochemical processes

== See also ==
- Shvets, a surname (including a list of people with the name)
- Svetly (disambiguation)
- Sveta (disambiguation)
