= Sveta =

Sveta may refer to:

== People ==
- Svetlana, a Russian feminine given name
- Sveta Grigorjeva (born 1988), Estonian choreographer
- Sveta Planman (born 1979), Russian-born Finnish fashion designer
- Sveta Ugolyok (born c. 2000), Russian model

== Other uses ==
- 4118 Sveta, an asteroid
- Sveta, Demir Hisar, a village in North Macedonia

== See also ==
- Swetha (disambiguation)
- Svet (disambiguation)
