= Svetly (inhabited locality) =

Svetly (Russian: Све́тлый; masculine), Svetlaya (Све́тлая; feminine), or Svetloye (Све́тлое; neuter) is the name of several inhabited localities in Russia.

== Modern localities ==
Urban localities

- Svetly, Kaliningrad Oblast, a town in Kaliningrad Oblast; administratively incorporated as a town of oblast significance
- Svetly, Sakha Republic, an urban-type settlement in Mirninsky District of the Sakha Republic
- Svetlaya, Primorsky Krai, an urban-type settlement in Terneysky District of Primorsky Krai

Rural localities

- Svetly, Arkhangelsk Oblast, a settlement in Svetlozersky Selsoviet of Kholmogorsky District of Arkhangelsk Oblast
- Svetly, Klimovsky District, Bryansk Oblast, a settlement in Novoyurkovichsky Selsoviet of Klimovsky District of Bryansk Oblast
- Svetly, Chelyabinsk Oblast, a settlement in Borisovsky Selsoviet of Plastovsky District of Chelyabinsk Oblast
- Svetly, Bodaybinsky District, Irkutsk Oblast, a settlement in Bodaybinsky District, Irkutsk Oblast
- Svetly, Ivanovo Oblast, a selo in Teykovsky District of Ivanovo Oblast
- Svetly, Republic of Kalmykia, a settlement in Svetlovskaya Rural Administration of Iki-Burulsky District of the Republic of Kalmykia
- Svetly, Kamchatka Krai, a settlement in Yelizovsky District of Kamchatka Krai
- Svetly, Khanty-Mansi Autonomous Okrug, a settlement in Beryozovsky District of Khanty-Mansi Autonomous Okrug
- Svetly, Kirov Oblast, a settlement in Svetlovsky Rural Okrug of Kotelnichsky District of Kirov Oblast
- Svetly, Gelendzhik, Krasnodar Krai, a settlement in Divnomorsky Rural Okrug of the Town of Gelendzhik in Krasnodar Krai
- Svetly, Otradnensky District, Krasnodar Krai, a settlement in Blagodarnensky Rural Okrug of Otradnensky District of Krasnodar Krai
- Svetly, Lipetsk Oblast, a settlement in Ognevsky Selsoviet of Stanovlyansky District of Lipetsk Oblast
- Svetly, Mari El Republic, a settlement in Sidorovsky Rural Okrug of Medvedevsky District of the Mari El Republic
- Svetly, Murmansk Oblast, an inhabited locality under the administrative jurisdiction of the urban-type settlement of Verkhnetulomsky in Kolsky District of Murmansk Oblast
- Svetly, Novgorod Oblast, a khutor in Novorakhinskoye Settlement of Krestetsky District of Novgorod Oblast
- Svetly, Novosibirsk Oblast, a settlement in Kochenyovsky District of Novosibirsk Oblast
- Svetly, Sakmarsky District, Orenburg Oblast, a settlement in Svetly Selsoviet of Sakmarsky District of Orenburg Oblast
- Svetly, Svetlinsky District, Orenburg Oblast, a settlement in Svetlinsky Settlement Council of Svetlinsky District of Orenburg Oblast
- Svetly, Perm Krai, a settlement in Osinsky District of Perm Krai
- Svetly, Kamensky District, Rostov Oblast, a khutor in Volchenskoye Rural Settlement of Kamensky District of Rostov Oblast
- Svetly, Kasharsky District, Rostov Oblast, a settlement in Kiyevskoye Rural Settlement of Kasharsky District of Rostov Oblast
- Svetly, Saratov Oblast, a settlement in Saratov Oblast; administratively incorporated as a closed administrative-territorial formation
- Svetly, Krasnopartizansky District, Saratov Oblast, a settlement in Krasnopartizansky District, Saratov Oblast
- Svetly, Stavropol Krai, a settlement in Svetlinsky Selsoviet of Novoalexandrovsky District of Stavropol Krai
- Svetly, Sverdlovsk Oblast, a settlement in Sysertsky District of Sverdlovsk Oblast
- Svetly, Tomsk, Tomsk Oblast, a settlement under the administrative jurisdiction of Tomsk City Under Oblast Jurisdiction in Tomsk Oblast
- Svetly, Asinovsky District, Tomsk Oblast, a settlement in Asinovsky District, Tomsk Oblast
- Svetly, Vladimir Oblast, a settlement in Alexandrovsky District of Vladimir Oblast
- Svetly, Volgograd Oblast, a settlement in Kislovsky Selsoviet of Bykovsky District of Volgograd Oblast
- Svetly, Voronezh Oblast, a settlement in Vasilyevskoye Rural Settlement of Talovsky District of Voronezh Oblast
- Svetly, Zabaykalsky Krai, a settlement in Tungokochensky District of Zabaykalsky Krai
- Svetloye, Altai Krai, a selo in Svetlovsky Selsoviet of Zavyalovsky District of Altai Krai
- Svetloye, Astrakhan Oblast, a selo in Fedorovsky Selsoviet of Ikryaninsky District of Astrakhan Oblast
- Svetloye, Chelyabinsk Oblast, a selo in Svetlovsky Selsoviet of Chesmensky District of Chelyabinsk Oblast
- Svetloye, Kaliningrad Oblast, a settlement in Novomoskovsky Rural Okrug of Guryevsky District of Kaliningrad Oblast
- Svetloye, Karachay-Cherkess Republic, a selo in Prikubansky District of the Karachay-Cherkess Republic
- Svetloye, Kurgan Oblast, a village in Nalimovsky Selsoviet of Lebyazhyevsky District of Kurgan Oblast
- Svetloye, Priozersky District, Leningrad Oblast, a village in Krasnoozernoye Settlement Municipal Formation of Priozersky District of Leningrad Oblast
- Svetloye, Nizhny Novgorod Oblast, a selo in Khakhalsky Selsoviet of Semyonov, Nizhny Novgorod Oblast|Semyonov, Nizhny Novgorod Oblast
- Svetloye, Krasnozyorsky District, Novosibirsk Oblast, a selo in Krasnozyorsky District, Novosibirsk Oblast
- Svetloye, Zdvinsky District, Novosibirsk Oblast, a selo in Zdvinsky District, Novosibirsk Oblast
- Svetloye, Pskov Oblast, a village in Nevelsky District of Pskov Oblast
- Svetloye, Smolensk Oblast, a village in Knyazhinskoye Rural Settlement of Pochinkovsky District of Smolensk Oblast
- Svetloye, Sverdlovsk Oblast, a selo in Sukholozhsky District of Sverdlovsk Oblast
- Svetloye, Udmurt Republic, a selo in Svetlyansky Selsoviet of Votkinsky District of the Udmurt Republic
- Svetlaya, Republic of Bashkortostan, a village in Kirillovsky Selsoviet of Ufimsky District of the Republic of Bashkortostan
- Svetlaya, Krasnoyarsk Krai, a village in Priluzhsky Selsoviet of Uzhursky District of Krasnoyarsk Krai
- Svetlaya, Novgorod Oblast, a village in Peredolskoye Settlement of Batetsky District of Novgorod Oblast
- Svetlaya, Tver Oblast, a village in Rzhevsky District of Tver Oblast

== Abolished localities ==
- Svetly, Pogarsky District, Bryansk Oblast, a settlement in Grinevsky Selsoviet of Pogarsky District of Bryansk Oblast; abolished in February 2009
- Svetly, Ekhirit-Bulagatsky District, Irkutsk Oblast, a settlement in Ekhirit-Bulagatsky District, Irkutsk Oblast; abolished in June 2015
- Svetloye, Vyborgsky District, Leningrad Oblast, a logging depot settlement under the administrative jurisdiction of Vyborgskoye Settlement Municipal Formation in Vyborgsky District of Leningrad Oblast; abolished in October 2011
