= Swetha =

Shwetha may refer to:

- Shweta, a given name (including a list of people with the name)
  - Rakshita, stage name of Indian actress Shweta
  - Nandita Swetha, stage name of Indian actress Swetha (born 1990)
- Swetha river, an Indian river in Tamil Nadu

== See also ==
- Sveta (disambiguation)
- Swetha Vinayagar Temple a Hindu temple situated in Tamil Nadu, India
- Shwait Malik, Indian politician
- Shwet Ashwas, motorcycle exhibition team of the military police in India
- Swet Bhairab, an aspect of Bhairava, the fierce avatar of the Hindu god Shiva
