= Perfluorodecyltrichlorosilane =

Names
- IUPAC name trichloro(3,3,4,4,5,5,6,6,7,7,8,8,9,9,10,10,10-heptadecafluorodecyl)silane
- Other names FDTS; Perfluorodecyltrichlorosilane; Perfluorooctylethyltrichlorosilane; 1H,1H,2H,2H-PERFLUORODECYLTRICHLOROSILANE; TRICHLORO-1H,1H,2H,2H-PERFLUORODECYLSILANE;

Identifiers
CAS Number	78560-44-8
3D model (JSmol)	Interactive image
ChemSpider	110171
ECHA InfoCard	100.110.513
EC Number	616-629-4
PubChem CID	123577
UNII	GS77FG2TLX
CompTox Dashboard (EPA)	DTXSID2074376
- InChI: InChI=1S/C10H4Cl3F17Si/c11-31(12,13)2-1-3(14,15)4(16,17)5(18,19)6(20,21)7(22,23)8(24,25)9(26,27)10(28,29)30/h1-2H2 Key: VIFIHLXNOOCGLJ-UHFFFAOYSA-N; InChI=1/C10H4Cl3F17Si/c11-31(12,13)2-1-3(14,15)4(16,17)5(18,19)6(20,21)7(22,23)8(24,25)9(26,27)10(28,29)30/h1-2H2 Key: VIFIHLXNOOCGLJ-UHFFFAOYAV
- SMILES: C(C[Si](Cl)(Cl)Cl)C(C(C(C(C(C(C(C(F)(F)F)(F)F)(F)F)(F)F)(F)F)(F)F)(F)F)(F)F

Properties
Chemical formula	CF_{3}(CF_{2})_{7}(CH_{2})_{2}SiCl_{3}
Molar mass	581.556 [g/mol]
Appearance	colourless liquid
Odor	pungent, resembling HCl
Density	1.7 g/cm^{3}
Boiling point	224 °C (435 °F; 497 K)
Solubility in water	hydrolysis
Solubility	soluble in THF, THP, toluene, and other organic solvents

Hazards
- Occupational safety and health (OHS/OSH)
Main hazards	Moisture sensitive
- Except where otherwise noted, data are given for materials in their standard state (at 25 °C [77 °F], 100 kPa). Infobox references

Perfluorodecyltrichlorosilane, also known as FDTS, is a colorless liquid chemical with molecular formula C_{10}H_{4}Cl_{3}F_{17}Si. FDTS molecules form self-assembled monolayers. They form covalent silicon–oxygen bonds to free hydroxyl (–OH) groups, such as the surfaces of glass, ceramics, or silica.

Due to its heavily fluorinated tail group, a FDTS monolayer reduces surface energy. Deposition of a FDTS monolayer is achieved by a relatively simple process, also known as molecular vapor deposition (MVD) It usually deposits from a vapor phase, at room to near-to-room temperatures (50 °C) and is thus compatible with most substrates. The process is usually carried out in a vacuum chamber and assisted by the presence of water vapor. Treated surfaces have water repellent and friction reducing properties.

For this reason, a FDTS monolayer is often applied to movable microparts of microelectromechanical systems (MEMS). A FDTS monolayer reduces surface energy and prevents sticking, so they are used to coat micro- and nano-features on stamps for a nanoimprint lithography which is becoming a method of choice for making electronics, organic photodiodes, microfluidics and other.

Reduced surface energy is helpful for reduction of ejection force and demolding of polymer parts in an injection molding and FDTS coating was applied onto some metallic injection molding molds and inserts.
