= Inline skate tuning =

Setup of inline skates

Terminology around inline skate setup, customization, and general inline skate tuning can vary depending on the skating discipline.

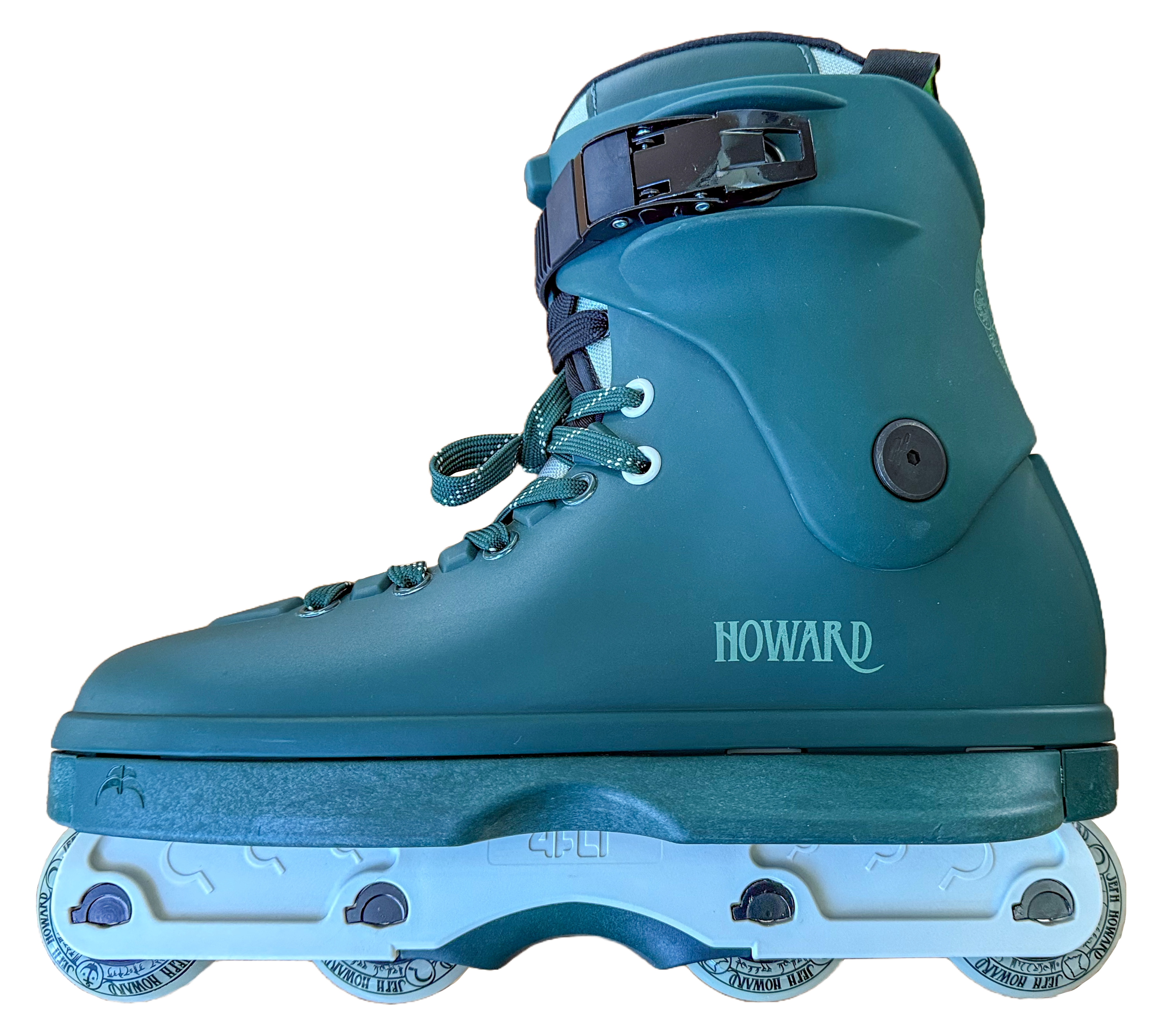
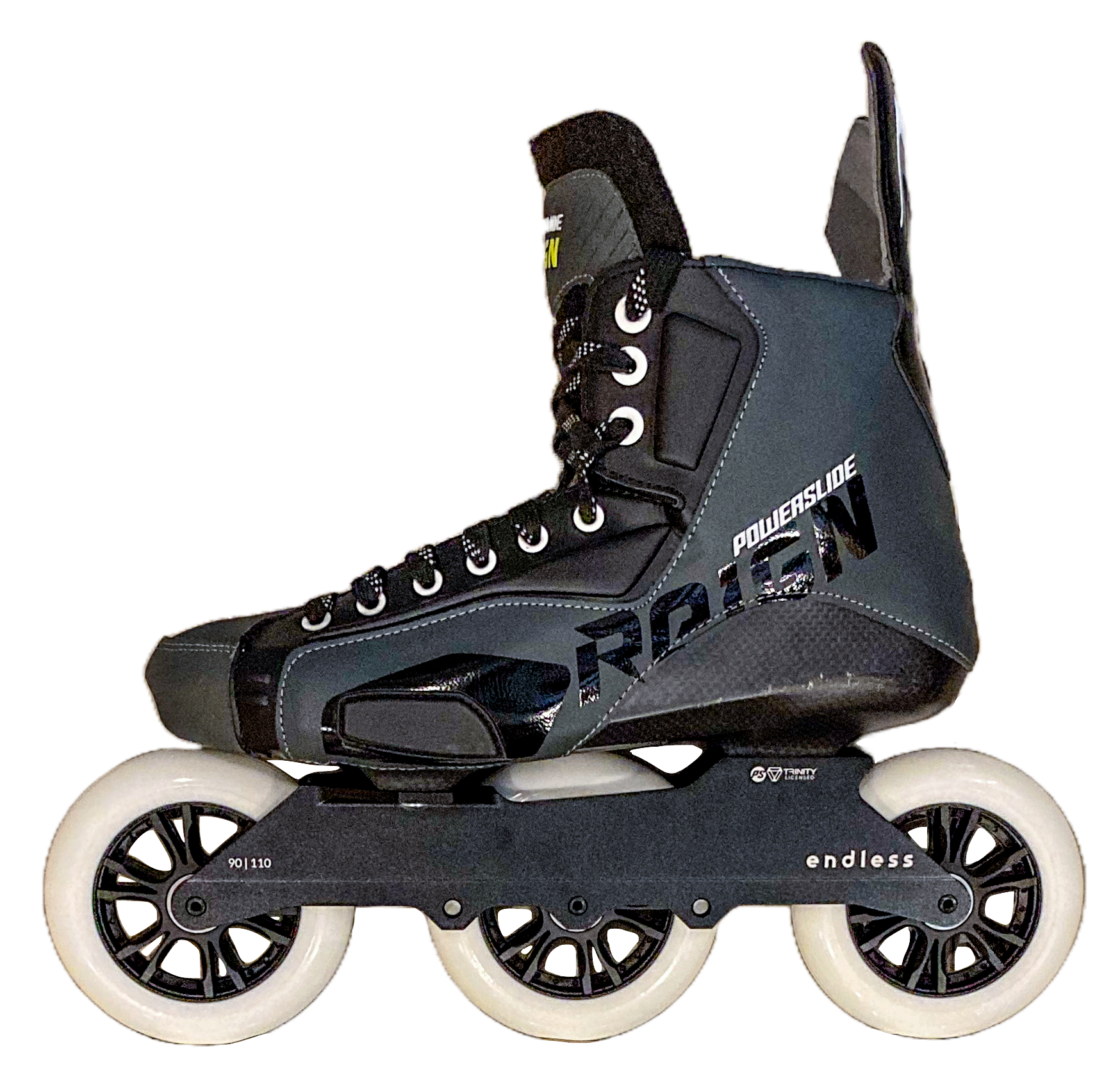
Standard aggro vs. big-wheel urban setup

For instance, to an urban skater, a big-wheel setup typically means either a four-wheel configuration with wheels larger than usual (e.g. 4x90mm), or a triskate with three wheels, usually 110 mm or larger. In contrast, for aggressive skaters, anything with wheels 80 mm or larger qualifies as a big-wheel setup. Meanwhile, for marathon skaters, large wheels are the standard. To them, a triskate with wheels smaller than 125 mm is considered small and unconventional. Labels such as "big-wheel" and "triskate" refer not just to the wheels but also to the frame and boot. For example, a triskate with 125 mm wheels requires a more robust frame and a supportive boot to handle the increased leverage and speed.

Generally, a wheel setup refers to both the number and size of wheels on a skate. A 4x80mm setup, which uses four wheels each measuring 80 mm in diameter, is common for recreational skates. A 3x110mm setup, featuring three 110 mm wheels, has become popular among urban skaters in the 2020s. There are also five-wheel configurations such as 5x80mm, which were widely used in the speed skating scene during the 1990s but are now primarily associated with wizard skating.

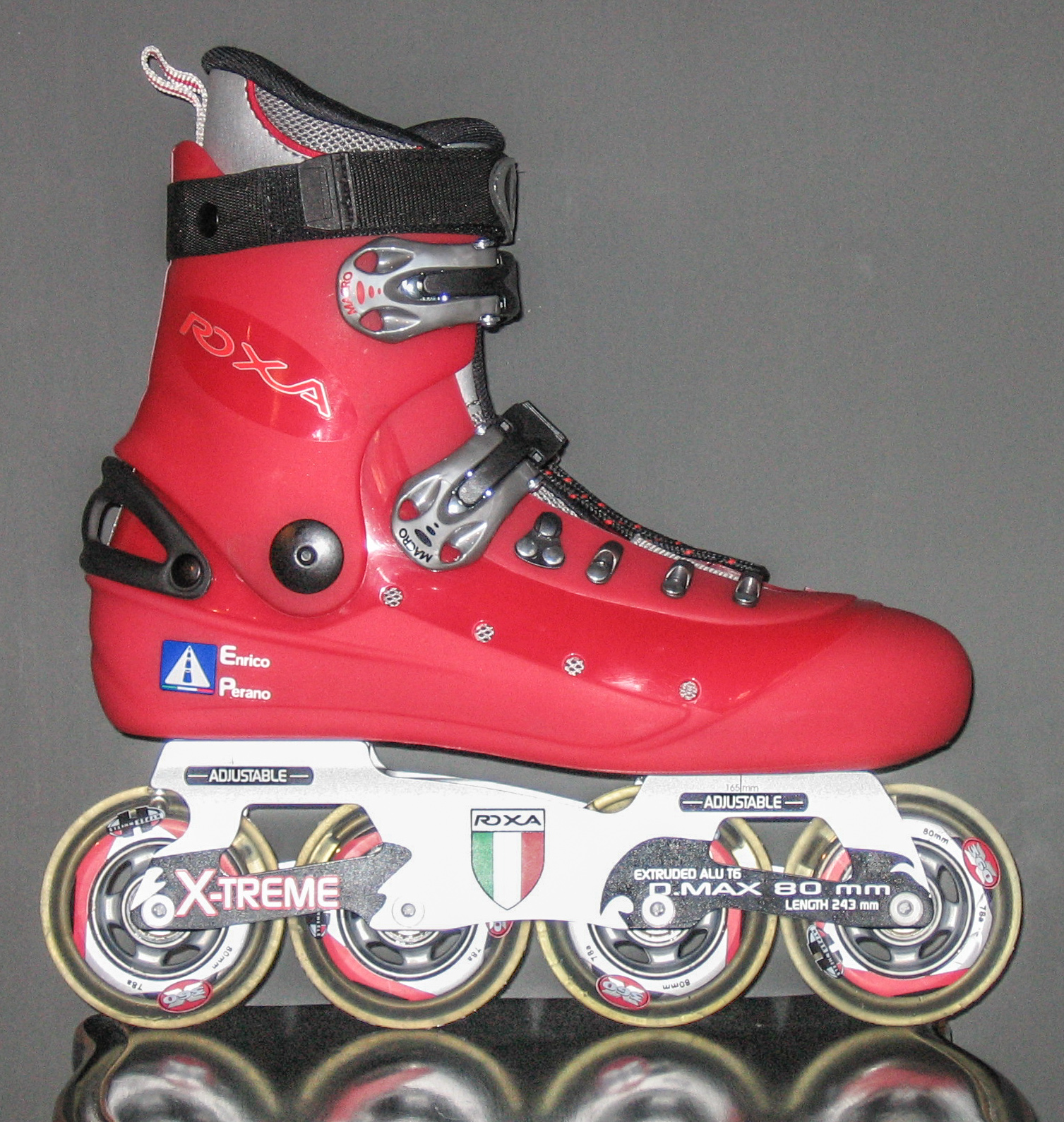
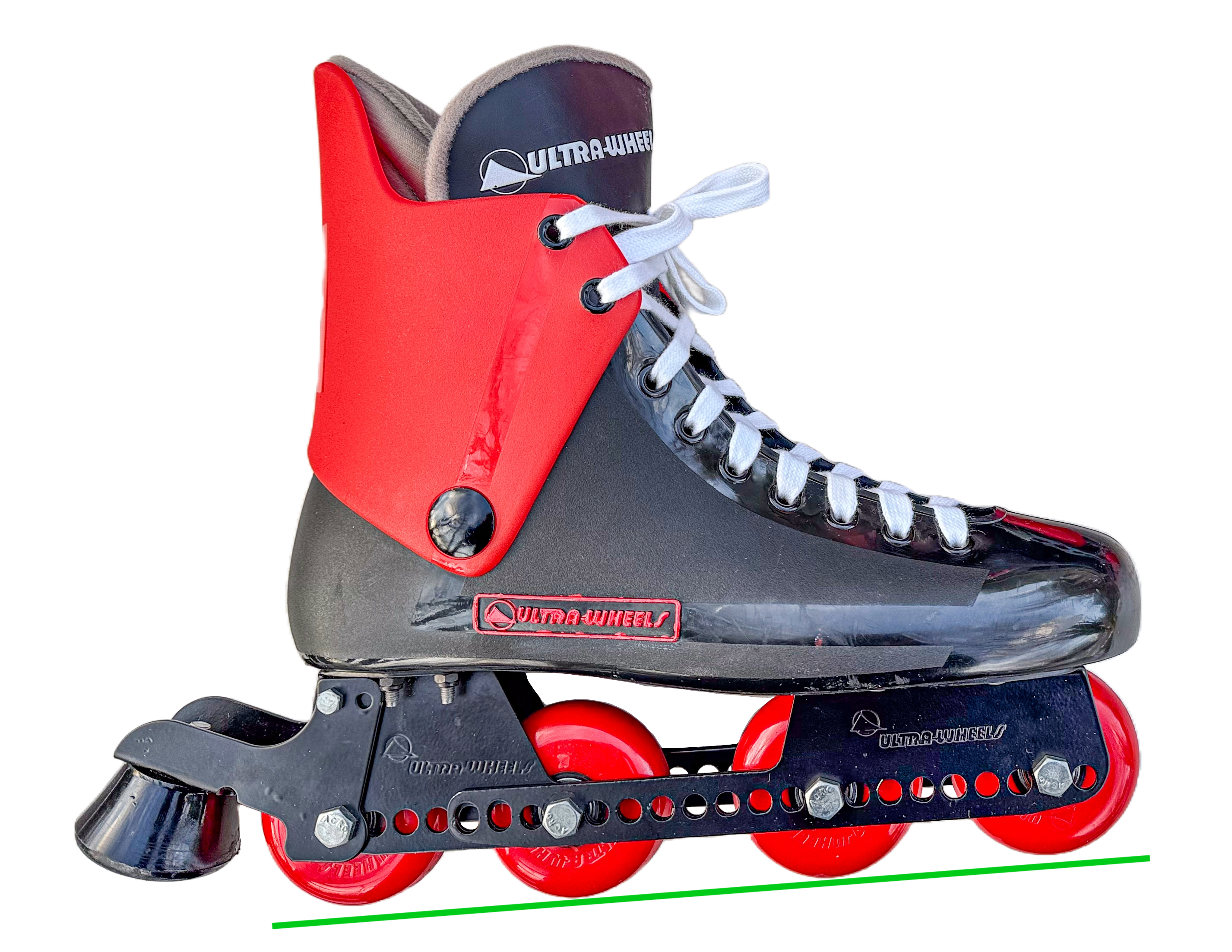
Flat setup (left) vs. rockered setup (right)

Beyond count and size, wheel setups also differ in how the wheels are arranged, resulting in distinct skating experiences even with identical wheel numbers and sizes. For example, when all four wheels in a 4x80mm setup touch the ground evenly, it’s called a flat setup or flat configuration. When the front and rear wheels are slightly raised, forming a banana-like curve in the profile of the wheel set, it’s known as a classic rockered setup. Another variation is the hi-lo setup, where progressively smaller wheels are installed from rear to front (for example, 80-78-76-74 mm). In this setup, all four wheels remain in contact with the ground, but the heel sits higher than the toe, simulating a slight forward lean or flex.

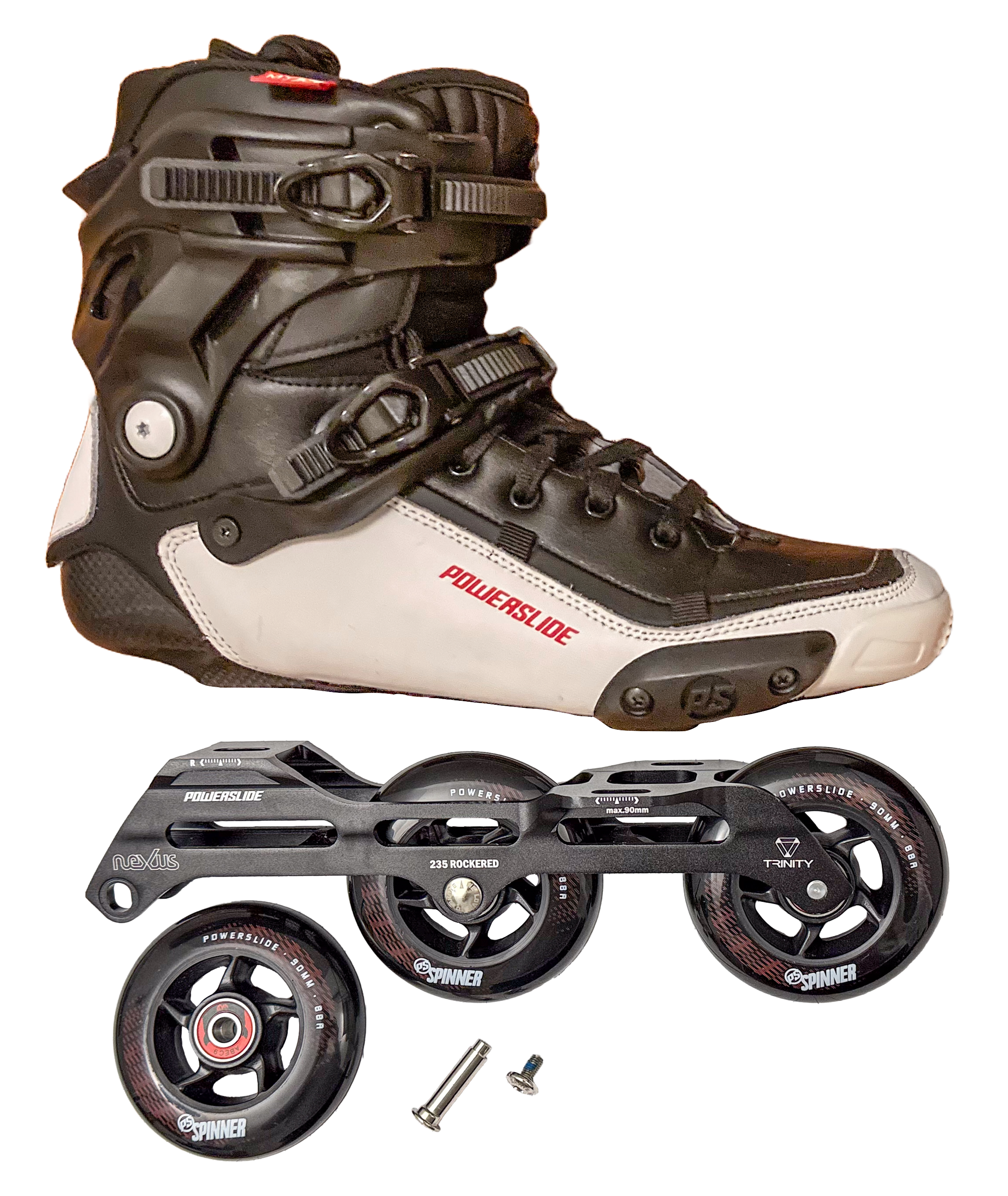
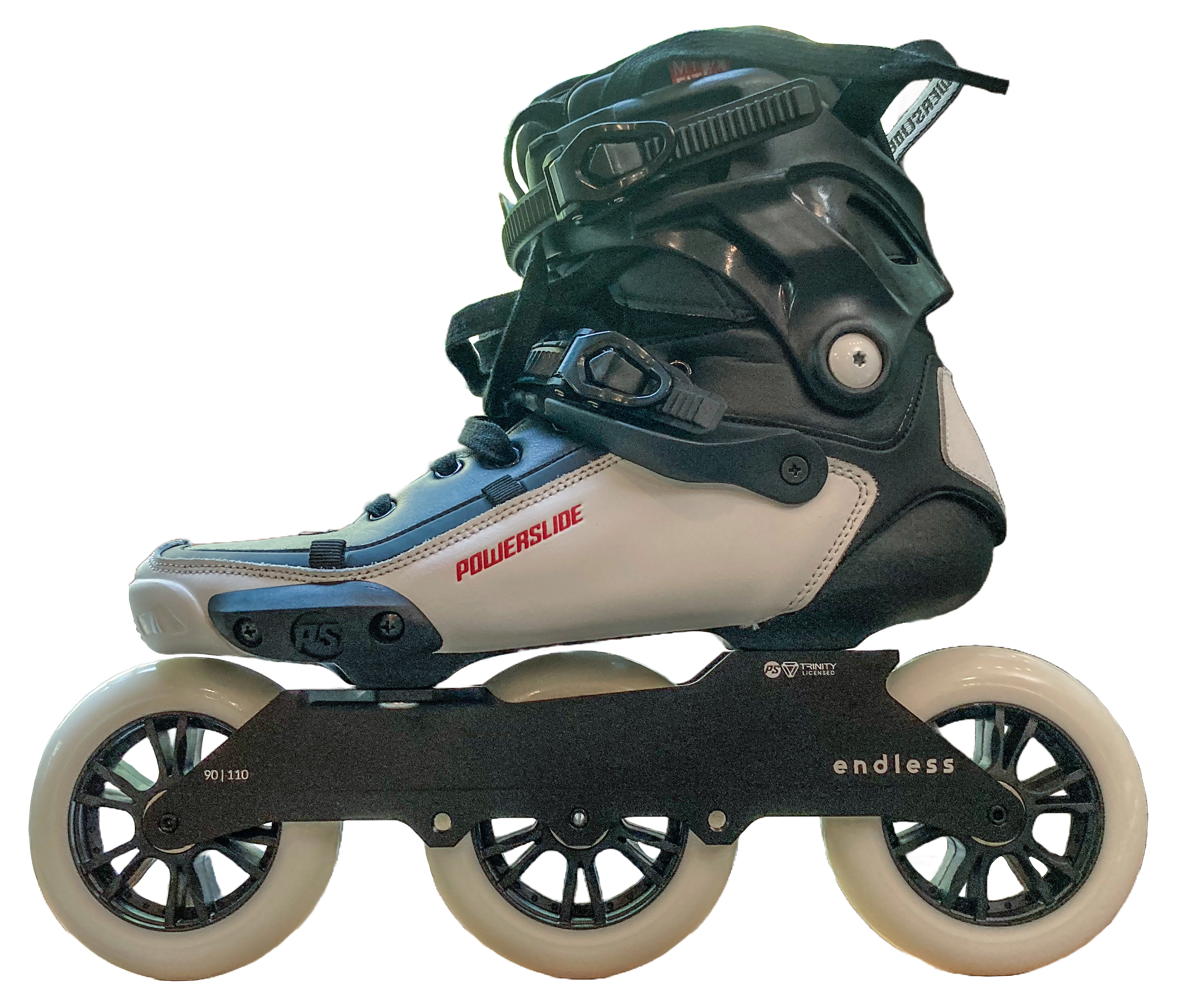
Same boot on different frames and wheels

A skater may customize a single boot with different wheel setups depending on the intended use. For example, a short frame with four soft 80 mm wheels might be mounted for indoor skating. On another day, the same boot could be fitted with a longer frame using three harder 110 mm wheels for outdoor long-distance sessions. Some frames are designed to support multiple configurations. The Endless 90 frame, for instance, is well known for accommodating both a 4x90mm setup and a 3x110mm setup. Even without changing the frame or boot, swapping wheels with different hardness, rebound, diameter, or profile can significantly alter the skating experience.

Regardless of the setup, skaters must rotate their wheels periodically to maintain even wear and preserve the intended wheel profile. For example, the front wheel often wears out more quickly, which can gradually shift a flat setup into a front-rockered one, if rotations are neglected. In some cases, specific rotation patterns take advantage of natural wear to achieve a particular profile, such as the hi-lo configuration.

== Wheel rotation ==
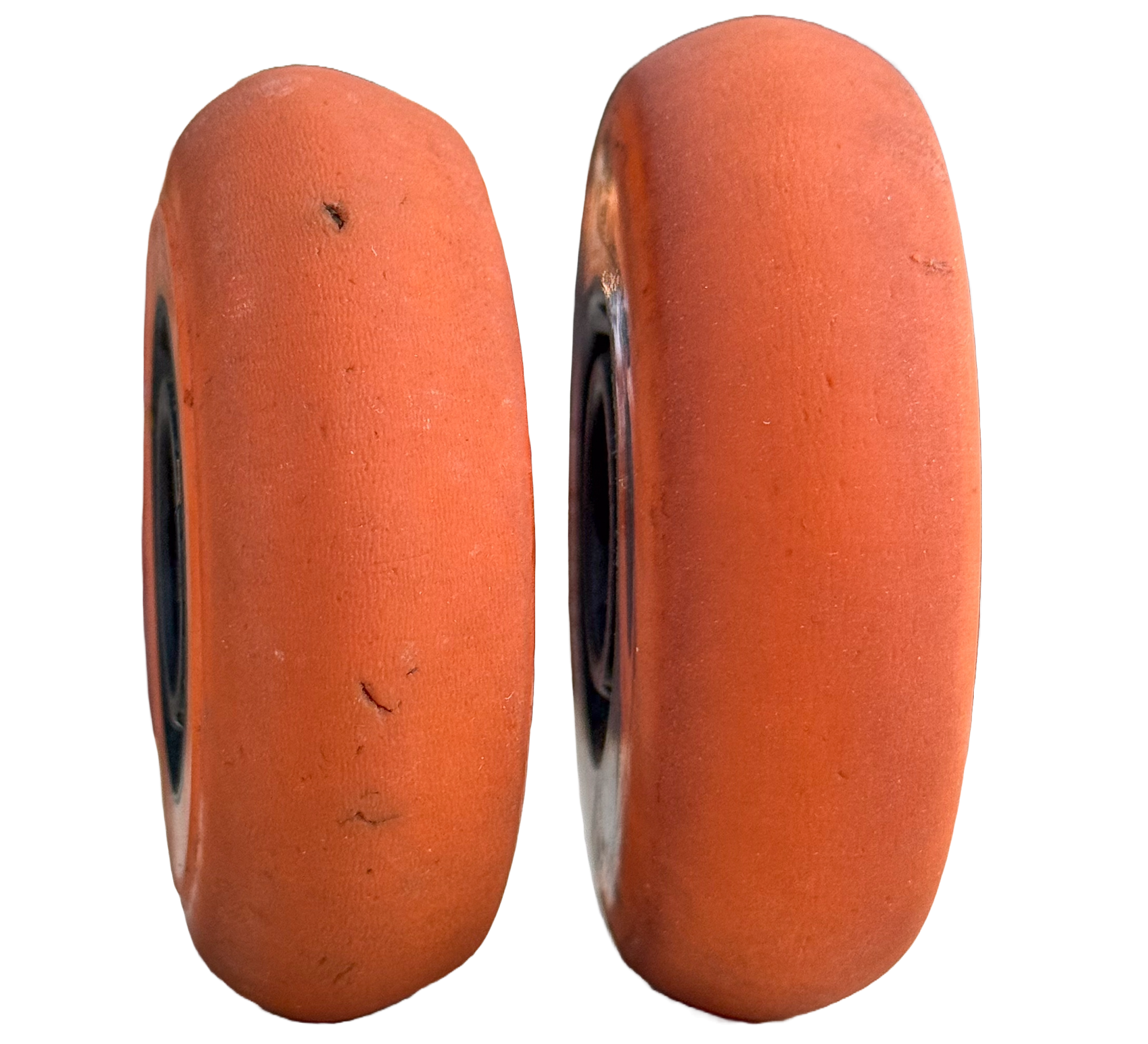
Severely worn (left) vs moderately worn (right)

Inline skate wheels are consumable components that wear down with use and require periodic rotation and eventual replacement. Typically, front wheels experience faster wear than rear wheels, and the inside edges degrade more quickly than the outside. Right-handed skaters often cause greater wear on the wheels of the right skate, the dominant foot, compared to the left. Excessive lopsided wear on one edge causes that side to lose its original wheel profile, compromising its intended performance. Severely worn polyurethane tires may become too thin and risk de-coring (disbonding from wheel hub) while a skater is in motion.

Regular wheel rotation helps distribute wear evenly, similar to tire rotation in car. This practice prevents any single wheel from becoming prematurely unusable and extends the functional lifespan of the entire set.

Wheel rotation generally involves three types of adjustments. First, wheels can be repositioned between axles to balance diameter differences, typically by moving less-worn wheels to positions that experience faster wear. Second, wheels can be flipped to reverse the inside and outside edges, mitigating lopsided wear caused by specific skating motions such as push-offs. Third, wheels can be swapped between the left and right skates to address asymmetrical wear due to foot dominance.

1-3/2-4 rotation

The most commonly recommended rotation pattern for a four-wheel setup in the 21st century is the 1-3/2-4 rotation. This method involves exchanging the first (frontmost) wheel with the third, and the second with the fourth (rearmost). This repositioning helps balance differences in wheel diameter caused by uneven wear. Simultaneously, each wheel is swapped between the left and right skates, effectively flipping them so that a worn inside edge becomes the outside edge on the opposite skate. This process addresses both lopsided edge wear and asymmetrical wear between skates, however it is unable to fully address wear because each wheel only adopts 2 of 4 possible positions, and must be paired with a second alternating rotation pattern, such as the 4-1-2-3 pattern, to produce truly balanced wear. In fact, any rotation diagram featuring double sided arrows used in isolation will never produce even wear. At some point, all of these regularly rotated wheels become severely worn and can be replaced together with a new set.

4-1-2-3 rotation

Various other rotation patterns may be appropriate depending on the skater’s style, discipline, and equipment. The optimal rotation method and frequency should be determined based on observed wear patterns, which can be influenced by factors such as the skater's weight, technique, skating surface roughness, and local climate conditions.

Another widely used rotation pattern, the first documented method, is the 4-1-2-3 rotation. It was first described in Rollerblades: Dryland Training for Ice Hockey, a book commissioned by Scott Olson in 1985. In this pattern, the frontmost wheel is moved to the fourth axle position, while the second, third, and rearmost wheels each shift forward by one position. Over time, each wheel rotates through all four axle positions in a typical four-wheel setup. Like the 1-3/2-4 rotation, this method helps distribute wear evenly across all wheels, allowing the entire set to be replaced at once when fully worn.

Hi-lo rotation

Yet another rotation method, known as the hi-lo rotation, is designed to minimize abrupt changes in effective wheel diameters that can occur following full wheel set replacements, an unintended side effect of both the 1-3/2-4 and 4-1-2-3 patterns. In this method, four wheels are removed from each skate, and all eight are stacked into a vertical column, sorted by observed diameter from largest (at the bottom) to smallest and most worn (at the top). If needed, the two most worn wheels at the top are discarded, and two new wheels are added to the bottom of the stack. The smallest remaining wheel is then mounted on the frontmost axle of the non-dominant skate, with its worn side facing outward. The second smallest wheel is mounted on the frontmost axle of the dominant skate. This process continues in ascending order of diameter, ending with the largest new wheel mounted on the rearmost axle of the dominant skate. The result is a hi-lo wheel setup that simulates forward flex, which some skaters prefer. Additionally, this method introduces minimal perceptible variation in ride height across rotations.

== Assemblies ==
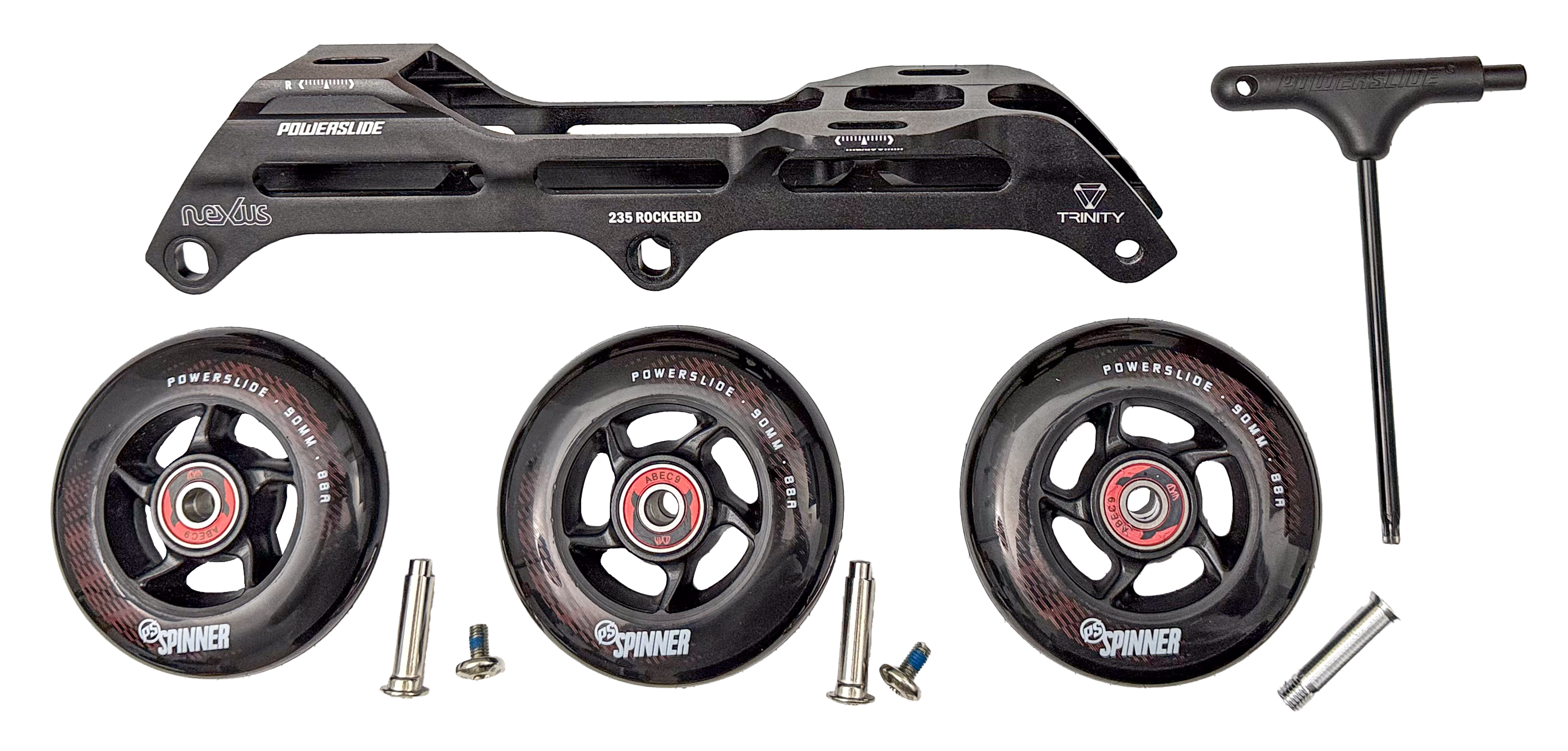
Some components of a skate

Customization discussions often focus on swapping or upgrading individual skate components. A given boot can accommodate a variety of compatible frames, and each frame is designed to receive a specific range of wheel sizes. Bearings and spacers within the wheels can be upgraded or replaced, as can axle screws, bolts, and bushings. In some cases, a particular combination of components is treated as a single unit during customization conversations.

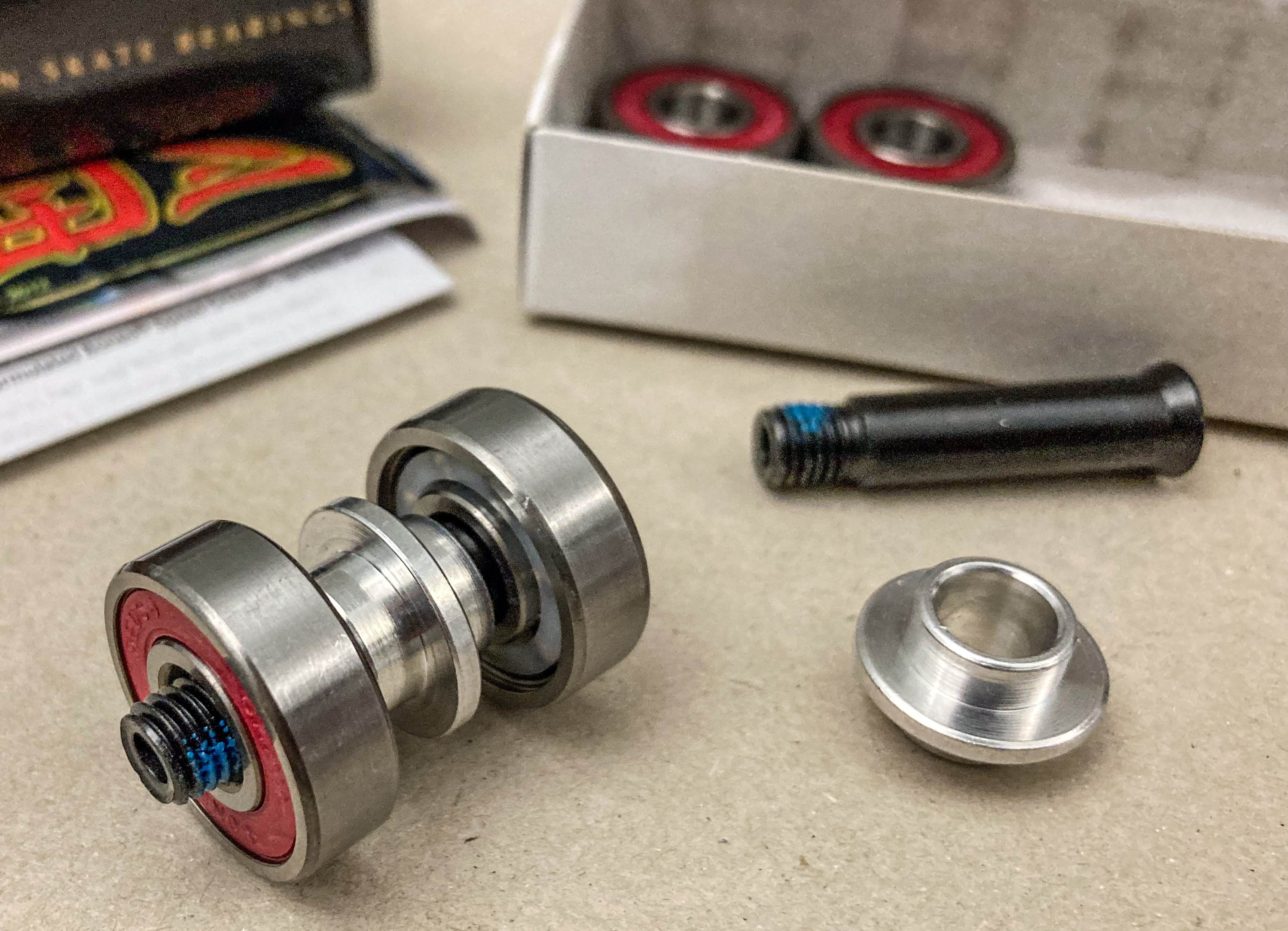
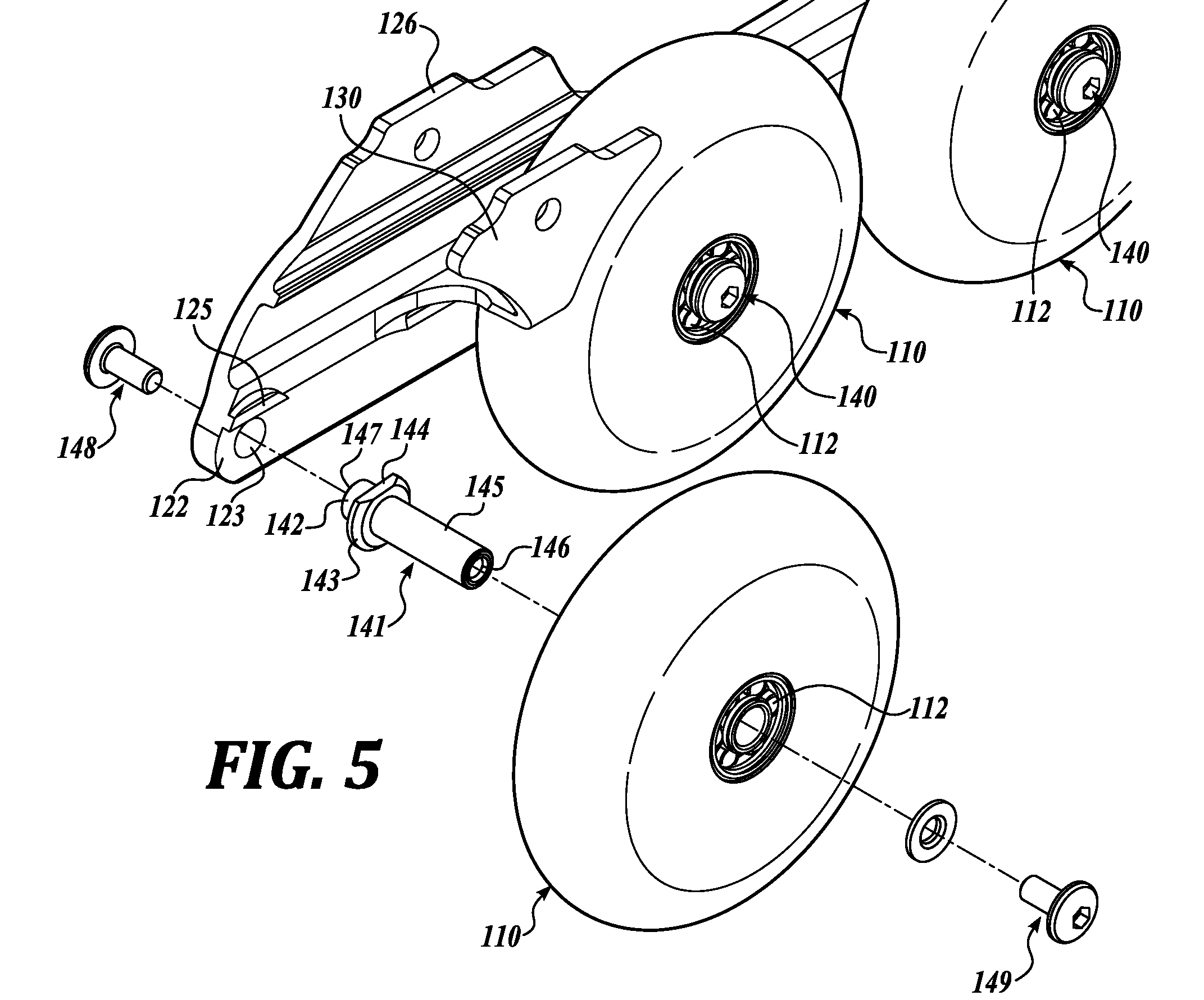
Bearing assembly (left). Wheel & axle assemblies (right)

While consumers and retailers typically lack standardized terms for these combinations, the skate industry uses the term assembly to describe them. In patent applications, where consistency and precision are important within individual applications, several types of assemblies are commonly defined. An axle assembly generally refers to the rods, screws, bolts, and bushings that form an axle capable of securing a wheel to the frame. A bearing assembly consists of two ball bearings separated by a spacer. When a bearing assembly is installed into a wheel hub with a polyurethane tire, the complete unit is often called a wheel assembly.

The term frame assembly typically refers to all components of a skate excluding the boot and wheel assemblies. In a standard recreational skate, this includes the frame itself, the brake unit, the hardware used to attach the frame to the boot, and the axle assemblies that secure the wheel assemblies to the frame. In aggressive skates, the frame assembly may also include H-blocks and other structural elements designed to support grinding and related maneuvers.

== Bearing alignment ==
Bearing misalignment is one of the most harmful issues in skating, second only to bearing contamination from dirt. When skaters customize their setups or replacing wheels, careful attention must be paid to how bearings are re-installed. If bearings are not properly aligned, or if they are allowed to shift after installation, the wheels can tilt. Misaligned wheels roll unevenly, drag against the frame, generate vibrations, and overheat the polyurethane tires, hubs, and bearing assembly. This not only reduces performance but can also cause tires to debond from their hubs and lead to premature wear on bearings and axles.

Bearing recess and abutment

In the 1980s, Rollerblade and Kryptonics jointly developed plastic hubs for inline skate wheels. A key design objective was to create precise, rigid bearing seats within the hub to hold and align the bearings accurately. Each bearing seat is formed on the side of the hub as a bearing recess measuring 7 mm deep, the exact width of an ISO 608 ball bearing, allowing the bearings to be press-fit with a flush mount.

Inline skate wheel hubs have a standardized width of 24 mm, and all inline frames are designed to accommodate hubs of this exact size. With bearings mounted flush on either side, this leaves a 10 mm gap between them. This gap is filled by a bearing abutment, an internal protrusion molded into the hub that acts as a mechanical shoulder to precisely position and support the bearings.

Properly-aligned bearings

A ball bearing consists of two concentric races that rotate relative to each other. The outer race is friction-mounted into the bearing seat, becoming fixed in place with the hub and, by extension, the polyurethane tire. As a result, it rotates together with the wheel.

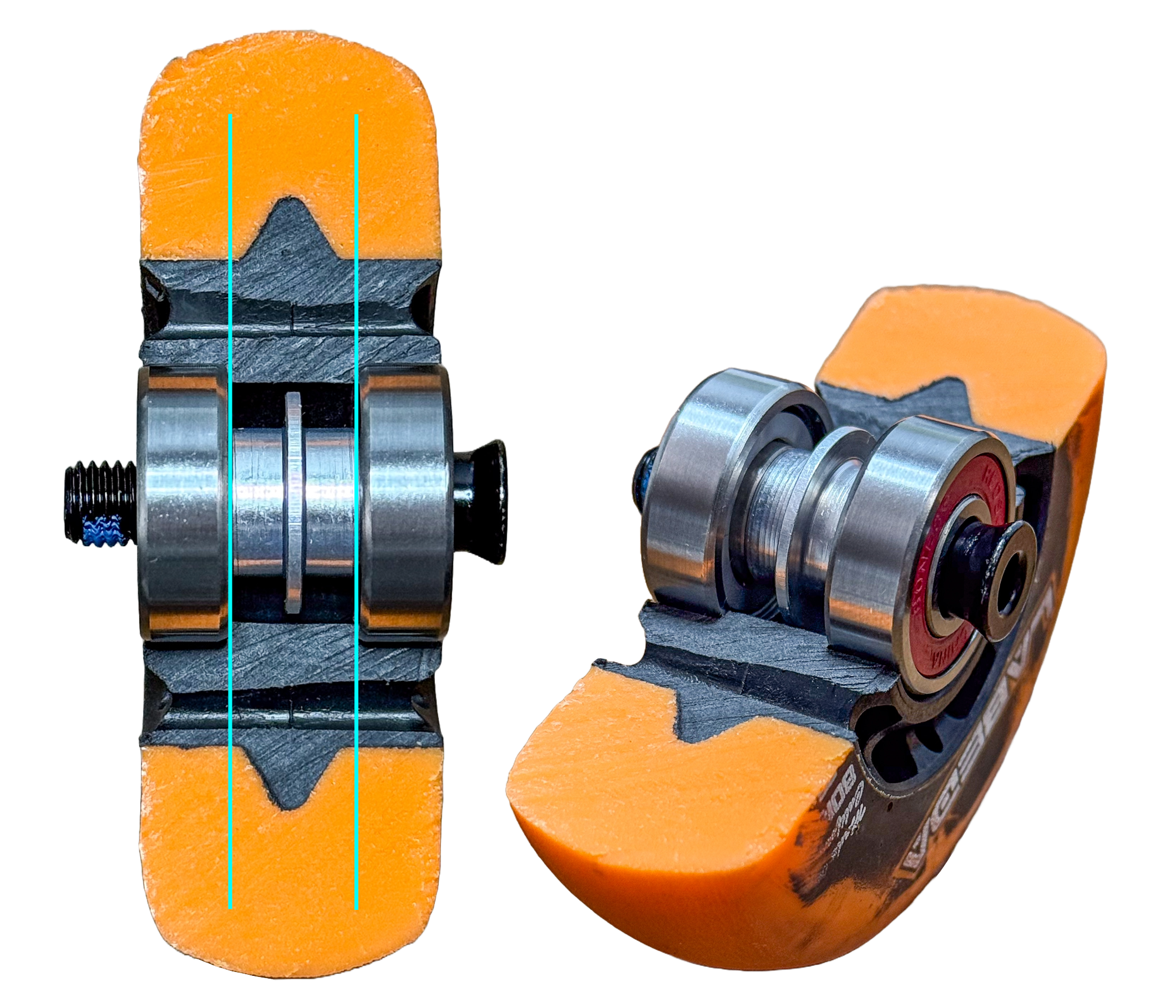
Bearing planes

The inner race, by contrast, is held stationary as part of the axle assembly. A spacer matching the 10 mm length of the hub’s bearing abutment is placed between the two inner races. When the axle bolt is tightened, it clamps the frame walls around the bearing assembly, which includes the two inner races and the spacer. This creates a rigid structure that binds the axle, spacer, and inner races together as a single fixture attached to the frame and, ultimately, the boot.

The bearing abutment and the outer race of the bearing together define a bearing plane. Each bearing establishes its own plane, and the two planes should be parallel and spaced exactly 10 mm apart. The spacer and the inner races should also meet at these planes. Bearing alignment refers to the condition in which all of these geometric relationships are correctly maintained.

== Side load support ==
Deep groove ball bearing installed on an inline skate

ISO 608 bearings used in inline skates are classified as deep groove ball bearings, as opposed to angular contact ball bearings or cylindrical roller bearings. Deep groove ball bearings, also referred to as radial ball bearings, are primarily designed to support loads applied perpendicular (radial) to the axle shaft. In inline skating, the skater's weight is transmitted from the boot to the frame and then to the axles, which are bound to the inner races of the bearings. As a result, the inner races apply radial loads to the bearing balls, which in turn press against the outer races. Radial load in skating is thus colloquially known as vertical load.

Vertical load and radial play

Side load and axial play

Deep groove ball bearings are also capable of handling a certain amount of axial load from both directions. In inline skating, axial loads refer to side forces acting along the direction of the axles during skating, and are colloquially known as side load. These forces are produced by maneuvers that involve a deep edge, such as turning, crossovers, power slides, and power stops. Additional axial loads may arise from techniques like slalom and the double push.

Some purpose-built bearings, such as the Bones Swiss, are designed with larger internal clearance to better accommodate side loading. This contrasts with 608 bearings used in electronic appliances, which typically have tight clearances - meaning minimal gaps between the balls and raceways. It is important to distinguish larger clearance from lower manufacturing precision, as these are two separate specifications in bearing design. Increased axial clearance (or axial play) in skate bearings is intentional, allowing the inner race to shift slightly relative to the outer race. This lateral movement changes the contact angle between the balls and raceways from vertical to oblique, improving the bearing’s ability to support axial loads without causing the balls to bind against the race shoulders.

== Bearing preload ==
Radial play creates uneven load distribution

Increased internal clearance in skate bearings allows inline skaters to perform side-loading maneuvers without causing the ball bearings to bind. However, this larger clearance also creates a distinction between a load-bearing zone and a non-load-bearing zone around the circumference of the bearing. When a skater’s weight is applied to the skate, the vertical load on the inner race is supported primarily by the ball at the bottom and its immediate neighbors. These balls form the load-bearing zone, while the remaining balls make up the non-load-bearing zone and do not support the skater's weight, resulting in an uneven load distribution over balls.

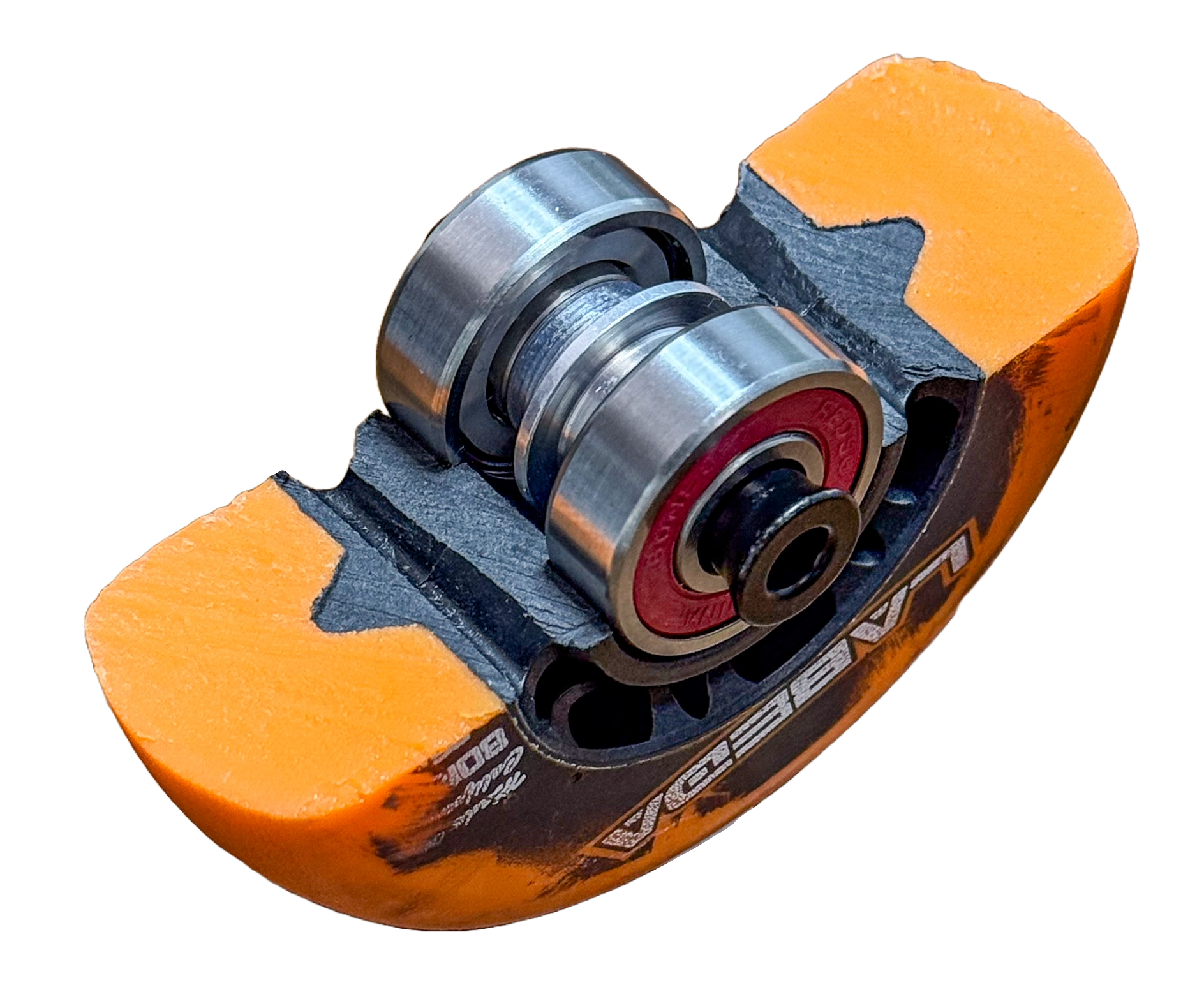
Bearings in a wheel

As the balls rotate through the bearing, they enter and exit the load-bearing zone, experiencing stress levels beyond their intended design when they temporarily shoulder the skater's weight. This repeated overloading leads to accelerated wear and a reduced bearing lifespan. On the other hand, when a ball reaches the top of the rotation, it loses contact with the outer race due to the clearance gap, creating a momentary separation. These unloaded balls tend to skid rather than roll, producing noise, wasting energy, and further increasing wear. In addition, uneven road surfaces apply constantly changing, multi-directional forces to the wheels and outer races. Because of the clearance gaps, these forces shake the outer races against the inner races, resulting in axle vibrations and amplifying any existing bearing misalignment.

Preload ensures even load distribution

Uneven load distribution can be significantly reduced by preloading the bearings. In inline skates, bearing preload refers to a specific type of axial load in which the axle bolt clamps the inner race of a bearing against a properly sized spacer. This setup pre-tensions the bearing balls at an oblique contact angle between the inner and outer races, reducing or eliminating internal clearance. As a result, all the balls remain engaged in supporting the skater’s weight throughout rotation, ensuring an even distribution of load.

== Spacer length ==
Spacer of the right length for optimal skating

Preloading is especially beneficial in disciplines that demand high-speed skating, such as downhill racing. In scenarios where even minimal wheel wobble can pose a safety risk, preload helps eliminate clearance gaps and prevents skidding between components, thereby reducing axle displacement during skating. This increases the rigidity of the entire wheel assembly, giving the skater enhanced stability, precision, and control.

For a given combination of frame, axle bolt, wheel hub, and bearings, it is possible to select a spacer of the right length so that, when the axle bolt is tightened, it clamps the inner races and the spacer with just the right amount of tension to achieve optimal preload. This results in a slight negative internal clearance of approximately -0.01 mm. This level of preload has been shown to minimize wear and maximize bearing lifespan by improving load distribution, which increases the bearing's load-carrying capacity. As a result, the bearing can better support the skater’s weight and reduce damage from high-impact maneuvers such as jumps.

Spacer so short that wheels bind

Due to manufacturing imperfections, it is rare for a spacer to exactly match the bearing abutment length within a wheel hub. Injection-molded plastic hubs lack the precision of ABEC-rated bearings and are often manually cleaned up after molding. Although the abutment is theoretically designed to measure 10 mm, its actual length can vary from one hub to another, and even within different areas of the same bore. To accommodate these variations, aluminum spacers are produced in a range of lengths, allowing skaters to custom-match spacers to the specific dimensions of each wheel assembly. (Note: Ricardo Lino toured the factory floor of Aend Industries, a polyurethane wheel factory, with co-owner Tony Gabriel. Discussions cover all aspects of wheel-making, including history of the company, co-ownership with Neil Piper, machines bought from Tom Peterson, brands they OEM for, injection molding of hubs (cores), trimming of hubs, polyurethane coloring, urethane bonding, dual-density urethane, hardness vs grippiness, hardness vs profile, heating of urethane before pouring, casting urethane into molds, baking after casting, cutting/shaving wheels to final profile, quality control, washing, printing, and packaging.) (Note: A Wicked spacer kit (archived) includes assorted spacers of these lengths: 9.90 mm, 9.95 mm, 10.00 mm 10.05 mm, 10.10 mm, 10.15 mm, (10.20 mm), 10.25 mm, 10.30 mm, 10.35 mm.)

If a spacer is too short, a skater can overtighten the axle bolt beyond the optimal preload tension. In mild cases, the spacer may be only slightly undersized by a small fraction of a millimeter. But even this can result in excessive negative clearance. The resulting over-tension increases bearing friction and can reduce bearing lifespan by an order of magnitude. In more severe cases, the spacer is so short that the bearing balls bind between the inner and outer races, potentially locking the wheels against the frame. (Note: See charts from NASA research and bearing manufacturers that illustrate bearing life as a function of internal clearance in radial ball bearings. At approximately -0.01 mm clearance (representing optimal preload), bearing life reaches 100%. If under-tensioned (i.e. the axle bolt is not fully tightened), bearing life drops by nearly half with a positive clearance gap of 0.05 mm. Conversely, if over-tensioned (i.e. using a spacer that is too short), an additional negative clearance of just -0.01 mm can reduce bearing life to 20%.)

Improperly loosened axle due to short spacer

To address over-tension caused by short spacers, skaters sometimes mistakenly loosen the axle bolts, believing this will properly relieve the excess preload when the wheels begin to spin freely again. However, in this loosened state, the spacer rattle and the inner races skid, as they are no longer firmly clamped to the frame by the axles. Skating with this setup often produces noticeable metal clunking sounds due to the significant gaps between the axle bolt and the bores of the spacers and inner races. Bearing planes can tilt out of vertical alignment, with the ample gap between the inner race and the axle. Side loads from skating maneuvers and jumps will cause excessive wear to the balls and raceways, effectively subjecting the inner races to repeated cycles of over-preload and under-tension. This problem is even more severe when skaters omit spacers altogether during wheel installation. Without a spacer to support the inner races under axial load, bearings thus worn may explode when subjected to significant side forces.

Longer spacers are better than shorter ones

When a perfectly sized spacer is not available, and a choice must be made between a slightly longer or slightly shorter one, it is recommended to use the longer spacer. This helps avoid bearing friction and severe wear caused by over-tensioning, which can occur with a shorter spacer. A slightly longer spacer prevents the axle bolt from applying preload to the bearings at all, because the outer races are unable to brace against the bearing abutments. However, it still allows the axle bolt to securely clamp the inner races and the spacer, effectively transfixing them to the frame.

With a longer spacer, the outer races are held in place only by the friction of the press-fit between the bearings and the hub’s bearing recess. This press-fit is often insufficient to prevent the outer races from shifting during skating, especially under maneuvers that generate strong side loads. Over time, this movement can wear out the bearing recess, allowing the entire wheel to shift laterally between the frame walls. A common symptom of this is a clicking sound during skating.

For recreational skating at moderate speeds, a slightly longer spacer is generally acceptable. The most common spacer length for inline skates is 10.2 mm, just slightly longer than the nominal 10 mm bearing abutment. However, to prevent wheel wobble at high speeds, competitive skaters carefully match each wheel with a spacer of precisely the correct length to achieve optimal preload. Spacer kits with assorted lengths are available for this purpose.
