= Svetly =

Svetly (masculine), Svetlaya (feminine), or Svetloye (neuter) may refer to:

- Svetly Urban Settlement, a municipal formation which the Settlement of Svetly in Mirninsky District of the Sakha Republic, Russia is incorporated as
- Svetloye Urban Settlement, a municipal formation which the urban-type settlement of Svetlaya in Terneysky District of Primorsky Krai, Russia is incorporated as
- Svetly (inhabited locality), several inhabited localities in Russia
- Svetlîi (Svetly), a commune in Gagauzia, Moldova
