= Svetly, Vladimir Oblast =

Svetly Светлый
- Settlement
- Location within Vladimir Oblast Location within Russia
- Coordinates: 56°24′N 38°46′E
- Country: Russia
- Region: Vladimir Oblast
- District: Alexandrovsky District
- Time zone: UTC+3:00

Svetly (Russian: Светлый) is a rural locality (a settlement) in Andreyevskoye Rural Settlement, Alexandrovsky District, Vladimir Oblast, Russia. The population was 349 as of 2010. There are 9 streets.

== Geography ==
The village is located 15 km west from Andreyevskoye and 3 km north-east from Alexandrov.

== Climate ==
Here, the climate is defined by its geographical position, which is related to the incidence of solar heat and the circulation of different marine, continental-sized salinity, and arctic air masses (from neighboring Western Europe, Central and South Asia, the Atlantic and the North Caucasus ) .
