= Svetlaya, Republic of Bashkortostan =

Svetlaya Светлая
- Village
- Location within Bashkortostan Location within Russia
- Coordinates: 54°44′N 56°15′E
- Country: Russia
- Region: Bashkortostan
- District: Ufimsky District
- Time zone: UTC+5:00

Svetlaya (Russian: Светлая) is a rural locality (a village) in Kirillovsky Selsoviet, Ufimsky District, Bashkortostan, Russia. The population was 93 as of 2010. There are 9 streets.

== Geography ==
Svetlaya is located 29 km east of Ufa (the district's administrative centre) by road. Shaksha is the nearest rural locality.
