= Svet (surname) =

Svet is a surname. Notable people with the surname include:

- Mateja Svet (born 1968), Slovene alpine skier
- Peter Svet (born 1949), Slovene runner
- Vladimir Svet (born 1992), Estonian politician
