= Svetly, Arkhangelsk Oblast =

Svetly Светлый
- Settlement
- Location within Arkhangelsk Oblast Location within Russia
- Coordinates: 64°02′N 42°41′E
- Country: Russia
- Region: Arkhangelsk Oblast
- District: Kholmogorsky District

Population
  - Total: 1,163
- Time zone: UTC+3:00

Svetly (Russian: Светлый) is a rural locality (a settlement) in Svetlozerskoye Rural Settlement of Kholmogorsky District, Arkhangelsk Oblast, Russia. The population was 1,163 as of 2010.

== Geography ==
The settlement Svetly is located in the east of the district of Kholmogorsky, near the Arkhangelsk - Karpogory railway line. The nearest settlement is the Siya (Pinezhsky). The settlement ends near the road "Zemtsovo - Syloga - Svetly".

There is a school, post office, ambulatory, savings bank, fire department, house of culture and church of the Venerable in the settlement.

Svetly is located 77 km southeast of Kholmogory (the district's administrative centre) by road.
