= Sveta Grigorjeva =

Estonian choreographer, dancer and poet (born 1988)

- Sveta Grigorjeva at the Tokko&Arrak Gallery for a panel discussion in 2026
- Born: Svetlana Grigorjeva; 16 January 1988 (age 38); Tallinn, Estonia
- Education: Tallinn University (MA); University of Giessen (MA); Estonian Academy of Music and Theatre (PhD candidate)
- Occupations: Choreographer, dancer, poet
- Writing career
- Period: 2011–present
- Genres: poetry; social critique; performance art
- Notable works: kes kardab sveta grigorjevat? (2013), Frankenstein (2023)

Svetlana Grigorjeva more commonly referred to as Sveta Grigorjeva (born 16 January 1988 in Tallinn) is an Estonian choreographer, dancer, and poet. Grigorjeva is a multidisciplinary artist. Her work addresses political and social issues, such as identity and gender. In her work, she often looks at modern life and the realities of living in post-Soviet Estonia.

== Early life and education ==
Grigorjeva was born in Tallinn in 1988 to parents of Estonian and Russian ethnic heritage and spoke Russian with her father growing up. She was raised in Lasnamäe, a district in Tallinn known for its Soviet-era housing and significant ethnic Russian population. In 2007, she graduated from Tallinn Kuristiku Gymnasium as a silver medal graduate, an award given to students in the Estonian education system who have exemplary marks.

Between 2008 and 2013, she studied choreography at Tallinn University, graduating with a Master of Arts. During this period, she studied abroad at the University of Nice Sophia Antipolis in France (2011) and directed the production Welcome to the Jungle in Greenland (2012) as part of the EMCDA Network programme. From 2017 to 2022, she received her second master's degree (in choreography) from the University of Giessen in Germany. In 2023, Grigorjeva started doctoral studies at the Estonian Academy of Music and Theatre, where her research focuses on the political nature of contemporary dance.

== Literary career ==
Grigorjeva is a multidisciplinary artist whose practice encompasses choreography, dance, and poetry. Her work frequently investigates the complexities of Estonian-Russian identity and critiques structural inequalities within post-Soviet society.

She often uses poetry and dance to address political and social issues ranging from gender to class. Across her work, she explores themes that advocate for the rights of marginalised groups, including women, ethnic minorities, those living in poverty, and people working in the creative sector. Her 2023 collection, Frankenstein, uses anatomical prose to critique structural inequalities and capitalism.

In 2022, she became a member of the Estonian Writers' Union. Her poems have appeared in international publications such as Words Without Borders. She also received the Tallinn University Literature Prize in 2013 and 2023.

=== who's afraid of sveta grigorjeva? [kes kardab sveta grigorjevat?] (2013) ===
Grigorjeva debuted as a poet in the literary journals Värske Rõhk and Vikerkaar. In the autumn of 2013, she published her debut collection, kes kardab sveta grigorjevat? (who's afraid of sveta grigorjeva?). The work has a direct style and explores the "other". Her work often has social and ethnic critiques about life in the context of post-Soviet Estonia.

In a 2013 review of kes kardab sveta grigorjevat? (who's afraid of sveta grigorjeva?) for Eesti Ekspress, Andrei Khvostov characterised her poetry as a manifestation of "werewolf syndrome," suggesting she exists in between Estonian and Russian identities. Khvostov argued that Grigorjeva represents a new type of Estonian person who refuses to conform to traditional milestones in life, such as marriage or property ownership, instead using her work to challenge the big bad wolf of societal expectations.

=== American Beauty (2018) ===
American Beauty is the second poetry collection of Grigorjeva's published by Suur Rida. The collection is a personal critique of society, including gender expectations. It provides an autobiographical exploration of her identity. The work also critiques traditional ideas of femininity. It also explores institutional pressures.

=== Raske realism (2019) ===
Grigorjeva's work also addresses the friction between competing historical narratives in Estonia and Russia. She explores bodily autonomy and the socio-political identity of the Estonian-Russian community through detailed descriptions of domestic life and everyday anxieties. In her 2019 piece Raske realism (English: Heavy Realism) she uses visceral imagery of blood and health concerns to parallel the silence and deflection people may experience when navigating difficult situations and family tensions. Her work often incorporates cultural references to modern life, such as Google, reality shows like Dom-2 (Russian: Дом-2, lit. 'House-2'), or radio stations like Datša FM.

=== Frankenstein (2023) ===
Grigorjeva's 2023 poetry collection, Frankenstein, repurposes Mary Shelley's "monster" as a modern-day metaphor for intersectional identity and societal outcasts. Published by Suur Rida, the work focuses on socio-political critique exploring decolonisation and power.

In a review in the Estonian literary journal Vikerkaar, critic Joosep Suusi discussed the opening text and categorised the book's structure as a blend of poetry, free-verse lyrical essays, and social critique. Writing for Värske Rõhk, critic Johanna Rahnik noted that the collection expanded the author's thematic scope from local sociopolitical commentary to reflections on war, physical embodiment, and the creator-creation dynamic.

The work received the Jaan Kross Literary Award in 2025, with the prize jury comparing the author's free-verse style to the literary debates initiated by Jaan Kross in the 1960s. The jury cited the work's ethical focus and its integration of marginalised Estonian perspectives within an international framework. The collection also received the Tallinn University Literature Prize for its artistic contribution and examination of body politics.

=== Bimbos Against the Apocalypse (2025–2026) ===
Bimbos Against the Apocalypse was a 2026 poetry and music performance piece. Originally debuted as a stylized play for a single voice, it was published in the winter issue of the Estonian cultural magazine Vikerkaar in December of 2025. It opens with the direction that is should be read "in a Paris Hilton-esque manner".

The piece was written as a feminist manifesto against environmental panic and patriarchal structures. The text was adapted into a live poetry-and-music performance for the HeadRead Literary Festival. Debuting as a collaborative performance with pop singer Laura Põldvere the work used poetry set to live music. It tackled doom and environmental anxiety through the lens of unfiltered and sex-positive hyper-femininity.

The rhythm in the piece relies on listing disparate experiences one after another. Grigorjeva borrowed from beat poetry, a style of poetry influenced by the syncopations, unexpected pauses, and erratic rhythm changes of Bebop jazz. Grigorjeva intersperses slang-heavy vocal ticks like "NOH", "NAH", and "EKS ON". She lists bimbos dealing with severe family abuse directly alongside those navigating Ozempic scripts, ADHD diagnoses, and Nietzschean willpower.

=== Feminist (2026) ===
Her short story Feminist was published in the March 2026 issue of the literary journal Vikerkaar, examines performative activism. It also looked at interpersonal manipulation within the Estonian cultural landscape. The narrative explores the experiences of a protagonist who encounters a man.

There was public speculation that the man in the story was not fictitious. He was later identified as the cultural critic Andrei Liimets. She critiqued him for presenting himself publicly as a feminist ally while exhibiting misogynistic and manipulative behaviours in his private life.

Grigorjeva writes about a protagonist’s struggle with non-consensual dynamics, highlighting how the man used his public persona to gain trust and access. She critiques how individuals weaponise progressive rhetoric to exploit women and how society protects some figures while marginalising those who speak out against them. The work sparked public debate about media ethics, accountability for male critics, and the challenges women face in creative industries.

The character’s identity as Liimets was revealed in the public discourse following the story’s publication in Vikerkaar. Grigorjeva later confirmed his identity on her social media channels. The story sparked a broader debate on media ethics and accountability in Estonia.

== Dance and choreography ==
Grigorjeva frequently performs in her own creations, often exploring feminist themes and challenging societal norms through her choreography. She has said her work is sometimes seen as challenging traditional definitions of dance because she has stated that her performances are sometimes not recognised as dance by the public or her own relatives. Grigorjeva’s choreography often explores the concept of bodies that extend beyond skin into surroundings.

=== "Who am I dancing today", "Welcome to the Jungle," "SÕP-RUS-EST", and "Attitude" (2012–2014) ===
Keda ma täna tantsin (translated as "Who am I dancing today") was an early piece by Grigorjeva. She also created "Welcome to the Jungle" in 2012, directed as part of the EMCDA Network programme, developed while she was studying abroad. In 2012, she also completed "SÕP-RUS-EST". In 2014, she created "Hoiak" ("Attitude"), which focused on questioning societal expectations.

=== "Smells Like Team Spirit", "Femmage" and "Hard Realism" (2015–2019) ===
In 2015, her piece "Smells Like Team Spirit" was presented at the Hiiumaa Dance Festival, which explored group dynamics, the angst of youth subculture and the physical manifestations of institutional alienation and the fragility of the body. Grigorjeva's 2017 performance in Femmage reimagined Mary Wigman's iconic "Witch Dance" through a lens of rebellion and defiance. Rather than mimicking the original, Grigorjeva embodied a puppet-like figure who rejected passive stereotypes, choosing instead to hiss at traditional expectations and project an attitude of overt arrogance. Critic Lea Soorsk said the contribution was strong with a clear connection between the performer and audience. She also made "Raske realism" ("Hard realism") in 2019, which was an exploration of visceral imagery (such as blood and illness) that paralleled the anxiety of navigating family trauma.

=== "TEKHNE", "FAKERZ", and "Dances to fall asleep, dream, rest and resist to" (2020–2024) ===
"TEKHNE" was part of her evolving body of work during the autumn of 2020 and was followed up by "FAKERZ" in 2021, which premiered in Narva and focused on performers that hacked and remixed dance styles as a collective. "Tantsud, mille saate uinuda, unistada, puhata ja vastupanu osutada" ("Dances to fall asleep, dream, rest and resist to")was a performance built around anti-masculine and anti-dramatic structures, using meditative movement to frame rest as an active rebellion against a hyper-productive capitalist world and was performed in 2023. In 2024, she completed "SÜTITAJAD" ("Igniters"), which was a critique of fake positivity, this piece focuses on the untamed agency of female performers defying traditional gaze and expectations.

=== "Gargantua" and "Cosmodolphins" (2025-present) ===
In 2025, she staged at VAT Teater, "Gargantua," a production which blended Rabelaisian Renaissance literature and affective physical expression. In it, she explored how human and non-human bodies interact with outside structural environments. In early 2026, Grigorjeva premiered the dance production Cosmodolphins, a collaborative project between the Südalinna Theatre and Sõltumatu Tantsu Lava. The work integrates folklore, utopia, and science fiction to challenge the prevailing narrative of human cruelty, suggesting instead that human evolution was driven by cooperation and kindness.

== Selected works ==
=== Writing ===
| Year | Title | English Translation | Reference |
|---|---|---|---|
| 2013 | kes kardab Sveta Grigorjevat? | who's Afraid of Sveta Grigorjeva? | |
| 2018 | American Beauty | — | |
| 2023 | Frankenstein | — | |
| 2024 | Kliitor on anarhist | The Clitoris is an Anarchist | |
| 2026 | Feminist | — | |
| 2026 | Mimmud maailmalõpu vastu | Bimbos Against the Apocalypse | |

=== Dance and choreography ===
| Year | Title | English Translation | Reference |
|---|---|---|---|
| 2011 | Keda ma täna tantsin | Who am I dancing today | — |
| 2012 | Welcome to the Jungle | — | — |
| 2012 | SÕP-RUS-EST | Friends-Russia-Estonia (Note: Play on words representing the relationship between Estonia and Russia. "SÕP" refers to the Estonian word sõprus (friendship), while "RUS" and "EST" serve as abbreviations for Russia and Estonia, respectively.) | |
| 2014 | Hoiak | Attitude | |
| 2015 | Smells Like Team Spirit | — | |
| 2019 | Raske realism | Heavy realism | (Note: The word "raske" can mean both "hard", "difficult", or "heavy," depending on the context.) |
| 2020 | „TEKHNE" | Craft | (Note: A transliteration of the ancient Greek term téchnē (τέχνη) that translates to craft, art, or skill.) |
| 2021 | „FAKERZ" | Fakers | |
| 2023 | Tantsud, mille saate uinuda, unistada, puhata ja vastupanu osutada | Dances to fall asleep, dream, rest and resist to | |
| 2024 | SÜTITAJAD | Igniters | |
| 2025 | Gargantua | — | (Note: Gargantua refers to the central character of a series of books written in the 16th century by the French writer François Rabelais. The story follows a giant who possesses an insatiable appetite and embodies the spirit of the Renaissance, celebrating humanism and the grotesque. In the context of Grigorjeva's 2025 production, the title is used to signify a "carnival of slimy, hairy, overflowing bodies.") |
| 2026 | Cosmodolphins | — | |

== Activism ==
On 21 August 2020, Grigorjeva delivered a speech in the presidential rose garden during the anniversary celebrations in honor of the Estonian Independence Day. In the address, titled "Unistan riigist, kus igaüks saab unistada suurelt" (I dream of a country where everyone can dream big), she offered a critical assessment of the country's social and political landscape. Grigorjeva highlighted that while Estonia has seen success since 1991, it was far from equitable. She identified her own presence at the event as a statistical anomaly, citing her background as the daughter of blue-collar workers from a mixed Estonian-Russian family.

Her critique focused on several key areas of national concern. She drew attention to the estimated 300,000 Estonians living in relative poverty and the high rates of absolute poverty among citizens aged 18 to 24. Grigorjeva criticised the rhetoric of the then-incumbent government coalition, arguing that its policies and public statements were exclusionary toward women, minorities, and foreign workers. She stated there were limits on the career prospects of Estonian-Russians and suggested the nation was yet to overcome deep-seated ethnic and linguistic segregation.

== See also ==
- Laura Põldvere
