= Scanning vibrating electrode technique =

Scanning vibrating electrode technique (SVET), also known as vibrating probe within the field of biology, is a scanning probe microscopy (SPM) technique which visualizes electrochemical processes at a sample. It was originally introduced in 1974 by Jaffe and Nuccitelli to investigate the electrical current densities near living cells. Starting in the 1980s Hugh Isaacs began to apply SVET to a number of different corrosion studies. SVET measures local current density distributions in the solution above the sample of interest, to map electrochemical processes in situ as they occur. It utilizes a probe, vibrating perpendicular to the sample of interest, to enhance the measured signal. It is related to scanning ion-selective electrode technique (SIET), which can be used with SVET in corrosion studies, and scanning reference electrode technique (SRET), which is a precursor to SVET.

== History ==
Scanning vibrating electrode technique was originally introduced to sensitively measure extracellular currents by Jaffe and Nuccitelli in 1974. Jaffe and Nuccitelli then demonstrated the ability of the technique through the measurement of the extracellular currents involved with amputated and re-generating newt limbs, developmental currents of chick embryos, and the electrical currents associated with amoeboid movement.

In corrosion, the scanning reference electrode technique (SRET) existed as the precursor to SVET, and was first introduced commercially and trademarked by Uniscan Instruments, now part of Bio-Logic Science Instruments. SRET is an in situ technique in which a reference electrode is scanned near a sample surface to map the potential distribution in the electrolyte above the sample. Using SRET it is possible to determine the anodic and cathodic sites of a corroding sample without the probe altering the corrosion process. SVET was first applied to and developed for the local investigation of corrosion processes by Hugh Isaacs.

== Principle of Operation ==
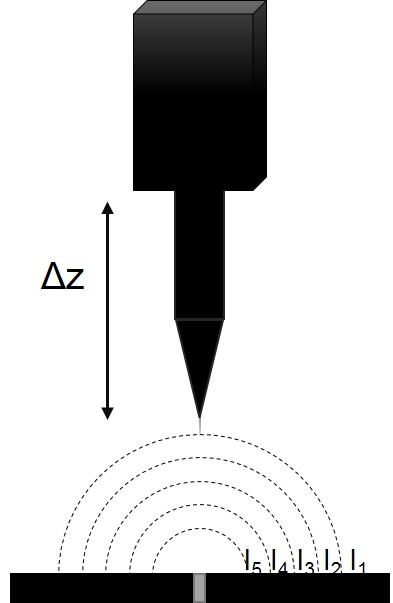
In SVET the probe vibrates in Z. During vibration it measures the current at different positions from the sample surface. This allows a map of local current density to be produced.

SVET measures the currents associated with a sample in solution with natural electrochemical activity, or which is biased to force electrochemical activity. In both cases the current radiates into solution from the active regions of the sample. In a typical SVET instrument the probe is mounted on a piezoelectric vibrator on and x,y stage. The probe is vibrated perpendicular to the plane of the sample resulting in the measurement of an ac signal. The resulting ac signal is detected and demodulated using an input phase angle by a lock-in amplifier to produce a dc signal. The input phase angle is typically found by manually adjusting the phase input of the Lock-in Amplifier until there is no response, 90 degrees is then added to determine the optimum phase. The reference phase can also be found automatically by some commercial instruments. The demodulated dc signal which results can then be plotted to reflect the local activity distribution.

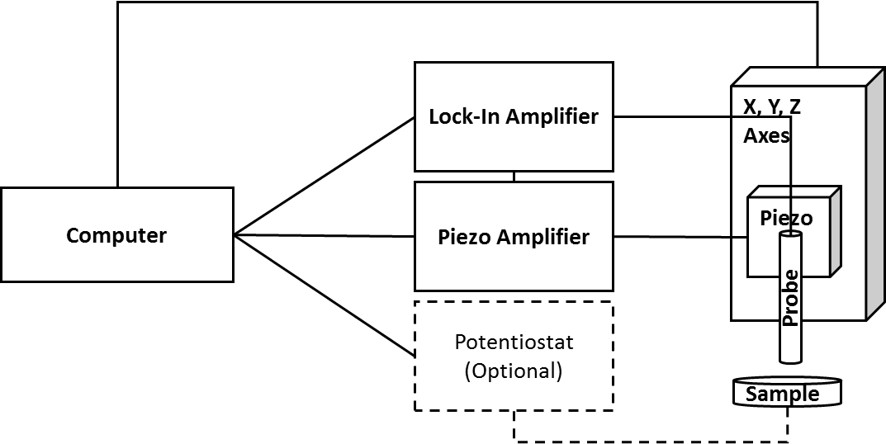
Block diagram of the electronics of the Scanning Vibrating Electrode Technique instrumentation, including piezo, lock-in amplifier, scanhead, and probe.

In SVET, the probe vibration results in a more sensitive measurement than its non-vibrating predecessors, as well as giving rise to an improvement of the signal-to-noise ratio. The probe vibration does not affect the process under study under normal experimental conditions.

The SVET signal is affected by a number of factors including the probe to sample distance, solution conductivity, and the SVET probe. The signal strength in a SVET measurement is influenced by the probe to sample distance. When all other variables are equal a smaller probe to sample distance will result in the measurement of a higher magnitude signal. The solution conductivity affects the signal strength in SVET measurements. With increasing solution conductivity, the signal strength of the SVET measurement decreases.

== Applications ==
Corrosion is a major application area in for SVET. SVET is used to follow the corrosion process and provide information not possible from any other technique. In corrosion it has been used to investigate a variety of processes including, but not limited to, local corrosion, self-healing coatings, Self-Assembled Monolayers (SAMs). SVET has also been used to investigate the effect of different local features on the corrosion properties of a system. For example, using SVET, the influence of the grains and grain boundaries of X70 was measured. A difference in current densities existed between the grains and grain boundaries with the SVET data suggesting the grain was anodic, and the boundary relatively cathodic. Through the use of SVET it has been possible to investigate the effect of changing the aluminum spacer width on the galvanic coupling between steel and magnesium, a pairing which can be found on automobiles. Increasing the spacer width reduced the coupling between magnesium and steel. More generally localized corrosion processes have been followed using SVET. For a variety of systems it has been possible to use SVET to follow the corrosion front as it moves across the sample over extended periods, providing insight into the corrosion mechanism. A number of groups have used SVET to analyze the efficiency of self-healing coatings, mapping the changes in surface activity over time. When SVET measurements of the bare metals are compared to the same metal with the smart coating it can be seen that the current density is lower for the coated surface. Furthermore, when a defect is made in the smart coating the current over the defect can be seen to decrease as the coating recovers. Mekhalif et. al. have performed a number of studies on SAMs formed on different metals to investigate their corrosion inhibition using SVET. The SVET studies revealed that the bare surfaces experience corrosion, with inhomogeneous activity measured by SVET. SVET was then used to investigate the effect of modification time, and exposure to corrosive solution. When a defect free SAM was investigated SVET showed homogeneous activity.

In the field of biology the vibrating probe technique has been used to investigate a variety of processes. Vibrating probe measurements of lung cancer tumor cells have shown that the electric fields above the tumor cell were statistically larger than those measured over the intact epithelium, with the tumor cell behaving as the anode. Furthermore, it was noted that the application of an electric field resulted in the migration of the tumor cells. Using vibrating probe, the electrical currents involved in the biological processes occurring at leaves have been measured. Through vibrating probe it has been possible to correlate electrical currents with the stomatal aperture, suggesting that stomatal opening was related to proton efflux. Based on this work further vibrating probe measurements also indicated a relationship between the photosynthetic activity of a plant and the flow of electrical current on its leaf surfaces, with the measured current changing when it was exposed to different types of light and dark. As a final example, the vibrating probe technique has been used in the investigation of currents associated with wounding in plants and animals. A vibrating probe measurement of maize roots found that large inward currents were associated with wounding of the root, with the current decreasing in magnitude away from the center of the wound. When similar experiments were performed on rat skin wounds, large outward currents were measured at the wound, with the strongest current measured at the wound edge. The ability of the vibrating probe to investigate wounding has even lead to the development of a hand held prototype vibrating probe device for use.

SVET has been used to investigate the photoconductive nature of semiconductor materials, by following changes in current density related to photoelectrochemical reactions. Using SVET the lithium/organic electrolyte interface, as in lithium battery systems has also been investigated.

Although SVET has almost exclusively been applied for the measurement of samples in aqueous environments, its application in non-aqueous environments has recently been demonstrated by Bastos et al.
