= Shwet Ashwas =

Motorcycle exhibition team of the military police in India

Shwet Ashwas, a motorcycle exhibition team of the military police in India, holds the Guinness World Record for making a pyramid of 133 men on 11 motorcycles over a distance of 350 metres at Bangalore on 22 September 1995.

The team continues to perform in various military events.
