= Sveta, Demir Hisar =

Sveta Света
- Village
- Location within North Macedonia
- Coordinates: 41.268586°N 21.271956°E
- Country: North Macedonia
- Region: Pelagonia
- Municipality: Demir Hisar

Population (2002)
  - Total: 332
- Time zone: UTC+1 (CET)
  - Summer (DST): UTC+2 (CEST)
- Website: .

Sveta (Macedonian: Света) is a village in the municipality of Demir Hisar, North Macedonia.

== Demographics ==
In the 1467/1468 defter the village had 48 households, 3 bachelors and 5 widows. The household heads almost entirely bore Slavic names, with only two instances of Albanian names appearing (Gerg Kovaç).

According to the 2002 census, the village had a total of 332 inhabitants. Ethnic groups in the village include:

- Macedonians 332
