= List of things named after Irving Langmuir =

Irving Langmuir (1881–1957), American chemist and physicist who made significant contributions to several widely varied areas of modern science, is the eponym of the topics listed below.

== Science ==
- Child–Langmuir law
- Hill–Langmuir equation
- Langmuir adsorption model
- Langmuir–Blodgett film
- Langmuir wave
- Langmuir–Blodgett trough
- Langmuir's examples
- Langmuir–Hinshelwood kinetics
- Langmuir isotherm
- Langmuir lattice
- Langmuir–McLean theory
- Langmuir monolayer
- Langmuir probe
  - Dual segmented Langmuir probe
- Langmuir–Taylor detector
- Langmuir torch
- Langmuir turbulence
- Langmuir circulation
- Langmuir equation
- Langmuir wave
- Langmuir states
- Lewis–Langmuir theory
- Knudsen-Langmuir equation
- Saha–Langmuir equation

== Other ==
- Irving Langmuir House
- Langmuir (journal)
- Langmuir (crater)
- Langmuir (unit)
- Langmuir Laboratory for Atmospheric Research
- Irving Langmuir Award
- Langmuir Cove
- Langmuir Hall, Stony Brook University
