= Langmuir =

Langmuir may refer to:

- Langmuir (crater), an impact crater on the Moon's far side
- Langmuir (journal), an academic journal on colloids, surfaces and interfaces, published by the American Chemical Society
- Langmuir (unit), a unit of exposure of an adsorbate/gas to a substrate used in surface science to study adsorption
- Langmuir Cove, a cove in the north end of Arrowsmith Peninsula, Graham Land, Antarctica
- Langmuir monolayer, a one-molecule thick layer of an insoluble organic material spread onto an aqueous subphase in a Langmuir-Blodgett trough
- Langmuir isotherm, a physical adsorption model of a gas or dilute solution assuming constant temperature
- Langmuir circulation, vortices on an ocean's surface

== People ==
- Alexander Langmuir (1910–1993), American epidemiologist
- Gavin I. Langmuir (1924–2005), Canadian veteran of World War II, historian of anti-Semitism and medievalist at Stanford University
- Irving Langmuir (1881–1957), American Nobel Prize-winning chemist and physicist
