= Evaporation =

Vaporization of a liquid from its surface

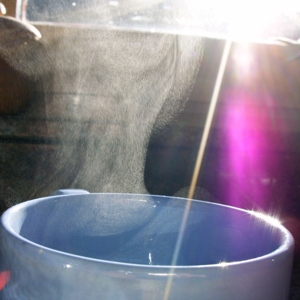
Aerosol of microscopic water droplets suspended in the air above a cup of hot tea after the water vapor has sufficiently cooled and condensed. Water vapor is an invisible gas, but the clouds of condensed droplets refract and scatter the sunlight and are thus visible.

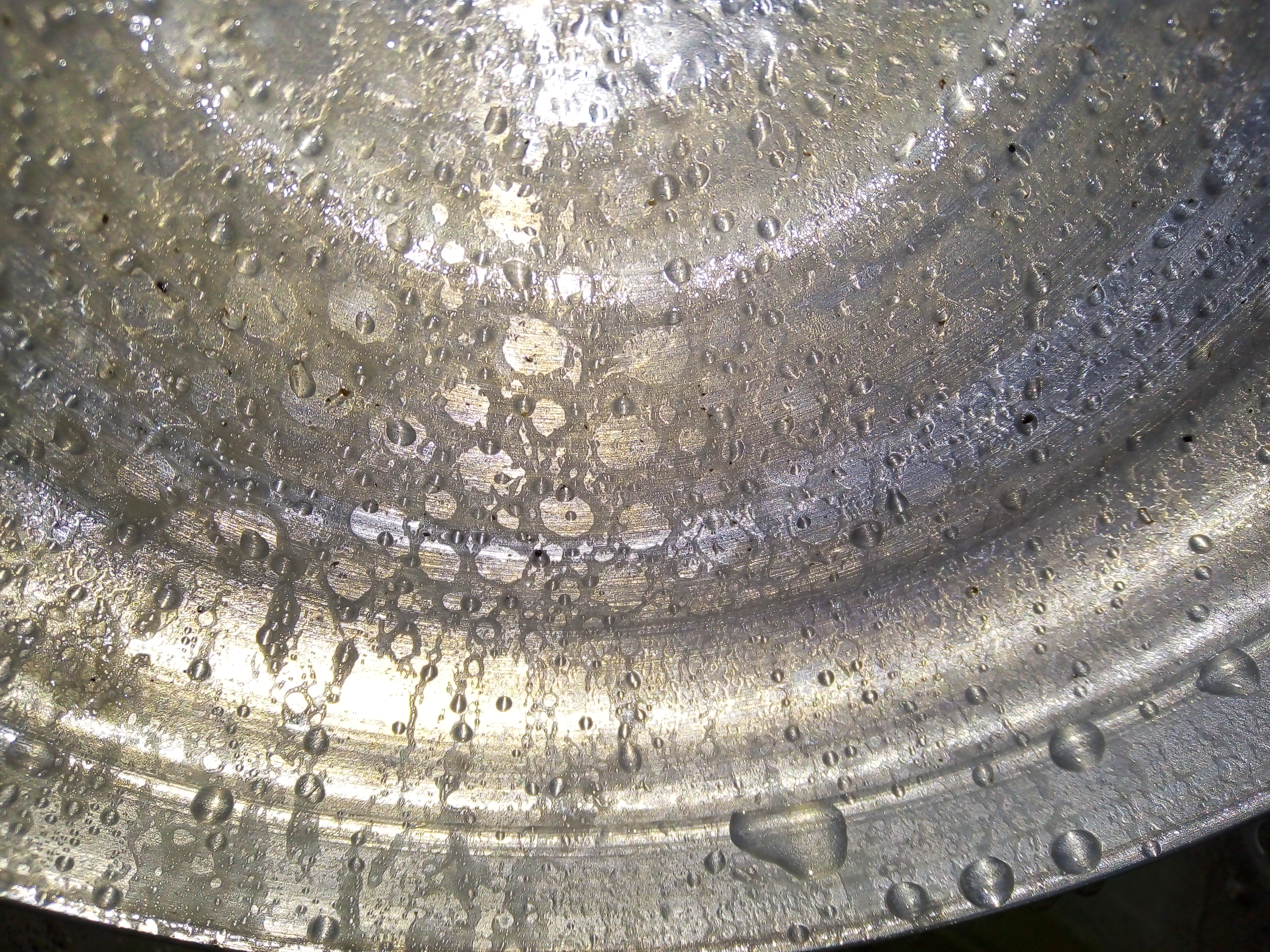
Droplets of water vapor in a pan.

Demonstration of evaporative cooling. When the sensor is dipped in ethanol and then taken out to evaporate, the instrument shows progressively lower temperature as the ethanol evaporates.

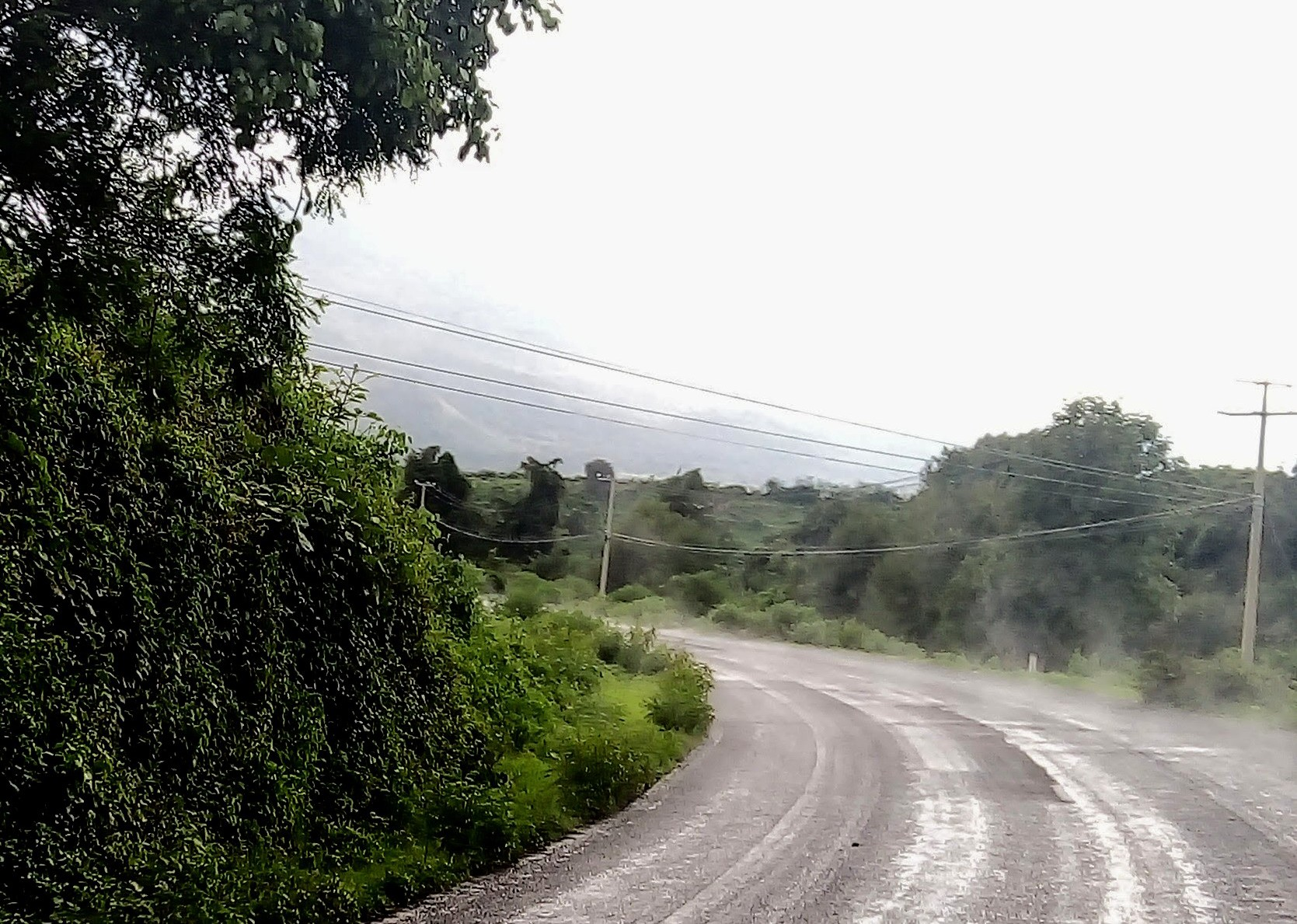
Rain evaporating after falling on hot pavement

Evaporation is a type of vaporization that occurs on the surface of a liquid as it changes into the gas phase. A high concentration of the evaporating substance in the surrounding gas significantly slows down evaporation, such as when humidity affects rate of evaporation of water. When the molecules of the liquid collide, they transfer energy to each other based on how they collide. When a molecule near the surface absorbs enough energy to overcome the vapor pressure, it will escape and enter the surrounding air as a gas. When evaporation occurs, the energy removed from the vaporized liquid will reduce the temperature of the liquid, resulting in evaporative cooling.

On average, only a fraction of the molecules in a liquid have enough heat energy to escape from the liquid. The evaporation will continue until an equilibrium is reached when the evaporation of the liquid is equal to its condensation. In an enclosed environment, a liquid will evaporate until the surrounding air is saturated.

Evaporation is an essential part of the water cycle. The sun (solar energy) drives evaporation of water from oceans, lakes, moisture in the soil, and other sources of water. In hydrology, evaporation and transpiration (which involves evaporation within plant stomata) are collectively termed evapotranspiration. Evaporation of water occurs when the surface of the liquid is exposed, allowing molecules to escape and form water vapor; this vapor can then rise up and form clouds. With sufficient energy, the liquid will turn into vapor.

== Theory ==
For molecules of a liquid to evaporate, they must be located near the surface, they have to be moving in the proper direction, and have sufficient kinetic energy to overcome liquid-phase intermolecular forces. When only a small proportion of the molecules meet these criteria, the rate of evaporation is low. Since the kinetic energy of a molecule is proportional to its temperature, evaporation proceeds more quickly at higher temperatures. As the faster-moving molecules escape, the remaining molecules have lower average kinetic energy, and the temperature of the liquid decreases. This phenomenon is also called evaporative cooling. This is why evaporating sweat cools the human body. Evaporation also tends to proceed more quickly with higher flow rates between the gaseous and liquid phase and in liquids with higher vapor pressure. For example, laundry on a clothes line will dry (by evaporation) more rapidly on a windy day than on a still day. Three key parts to evaporation are heat, atmospheric pressure (determines the percent humidity), and air movement.

On a molecular level, there is no strict boundary between the liquid state and the vapor state. Instead, there is a Knudsen layer, where the phase is undetermined. Because this layer is only a few molecules thick, at a macroscopic scale a clear phase transition interface cannot be seen.

Liquids that do not evaporate visibly at a given temperature in a given gas (e.g., cooking oil at room temperature) have molecules that do not tend to transfer energy to each other in a pattern sufficient to frequently give a molecule the heat energy necessary to turn into vapor. However, these liquids are evaporating. It is just that the process is much slower and thus significantly less visible.

=== Evaporative equilibrium ===
Vapor pressure of water vs. temperature. 760 Torr = 1 atm.

If evaporation takes place in an enclosed area, the escaping molecules accumulate as a vapor above the liquid. Many of the molecules return to the liquid, with returning molecules becoming more frequent as the density and pressure of the vapor increases. When the process of escape and return reaches an equilibrium, the vapor is said to be "saturated", and no further change in either vapor pressure and density or liquid temperature will occur. For a system consisting of vapor and liquid of a pure substance, this equilibrium state is directly related to the vapor pressure of the substance, as given by the Clausius–Clapeyron relation:

$$\ln \left( \frac{ P_2 }{ P_1 } \right) = - \frac{ \Delta H_{\rm  vap } }{ R } \left( \frac{ 1 }{ T_2 } - \frac{ 1 }{ T_1 }  \right)$$

where P_{1}, P_{2} are the vapor pressures at temperatures T_{1}, T_{2} respectively, ΔH_{vap} is the enthalpy of vaporization, and R is the universal gas constant. The rate of evaporation in an open system is related to the vapor pressure found in a closed system. If a liquid is heated, when the vapor pressure reaches the ambient pressure the liquid will boil.

The ability for a molecule of a liquid to evaporate is based largely on the amount of kinetic energy an individual particle may possess. Even at lower temperatures, individual molecules of a liquid can evaporate if they have more than the minimum amount of kinetic energy required for vaporization.

== Factors influencing the rate of evaporation ==
Note: Air is used here as a common example of the surrounding gas; however, other gases may hold that role.

Concentration of the substance evaporating in the air
If the air already has a high concentration of the substance evaporating, then the given substance will evaporate more slowly.
Flow rate of air
This is in part related to the concentration points above. If "fresh" air (i.e., air which is neither already saturated with the substance nor with other substances) is moving over the substance all the time, then the concentration of the substance in the air is less likely to go up with time, thus encouraging faster evaporation. This is the result of the boundary layer at the evaporation surface decreasing with flow velocity, decreasing the diffusion distance in the stagnant layer.

The amount of minerals dissolved in the liquid

Inter-molecular forces
The stronger the forces keeping the molecules together in the liquid state, the more energy one must get to escape. This is characterized by the enthalpy of vaporization.

Pressure
Evaporation happens faster if there is less exertion on the surface keeping the molecules from launching themselves.

Surface area
A substance that has a larger surface area will evaporate faster, as there are more surface molecules per unit of volume that are potentially able to escape.

Temperature of the substance
the higher the temperature of the substance the greater the kinetic energy of the molecules at its surface and therefore the faster the rate of their evaporation.

Photomolecular effect
The amount of light will affect the evaporation. When photons hits the surface area of the liquid they can make individual molecules break free and disappear into the air without any need for additional heat.

In the US, the National Weather Service measures, at various outdoor locations nationwide, the actual rate of evaporation from a standardized "pan" open water surface. Others do likewise around the world. The US data is collected and compiled into an annual evaporation map. The measurements range from under 30 to over 120 inches (3,000 mm) per year.

Because it typically takes place in a complex environment, where 'evaporation is an extremely rare event', the mechanism for the evaporation of water is not completely understood. Theoretical calculations require prohibitively long and large computer simulations. 'The rate of evaporation of liquid water is one of the principal uncertainties in modern climate modeling.'

== Thermodynamics ==
Thermodynamics of evaporation involves molecules gaining enough kinetic energy to overcome intermolecular forces and escape as gas, requiring energy (latent heat of vaporization) and causing cooling as faster molecules leave. This endothermic phase change increases entropy overall, aligning with the second law, and is driven by temperature, pressure, humidity, and surface area, making it fundamental to refrigeration and weather.

Evaporation is an endothermic process, since heat is absorbed during evaporation.

== Applications ==
- Industrial applications include many printing and coating processes; recovering salts from solutions; and drying a variety of materials such as lumber, paper, cloth and chemicals.
- The use of evaporation to dry or concentrate samples is a common preparatory step for many laboratory analyses such as spectroscopy and chromatography. Systems used for this purpose include rotary evaporators and centrifugal evaporators.
- When clothes are hung on a laundry line, even though the ambient temperature is below the boiling point of water, water evaporates. This is accelerated by factors such as low humidity, heat (from the sun), and wind. In a clothes dryer, hot air is blown through the clothes, allowing water to evaporate very rapidly.
- The matki/matka, a traditional Indian porous clay container used for storing and cooling water and other liquids.
- The botijo, a traditional Spanish porous clay container designed to cool the contained water by evaporation.
- Evaporative coolers, which can significantly cool a building by simply blowing dry air over a filter saturated with water.

=== Combustion vaporization ===
Fuel droplets vaporize as they receive heat by mixing with the hot gases in the combustion chamber. Heat (energy) can also be received by radiation from any hot refractory wall of the combustion chamber.

=== Pre-combustion vaporization ===
Internal combustion engines rely upon the vaporization of the fuel in the cylinders to form a fuel/air mixture in order to burn well. The chemically correct air/fuel mixture for total burning of gasoline has been determined to be about 15 parts air to one part gasoline or 15/1 by weight. Changing this to a volume ratio yields 8000 parts air to one part gasoline or 8,000/1 by volume.

=== Film deposition ===
Thin films may be deposited by evaporating a substance and condensing it onto a substrate, or by dissolving the substance in a solvent, spreading the resulting solution thinly over a substrate, and evaporating the solvent. The Hertz–Knudsen equation is often used to estimate the rate of evaporation in these instances.

== See also ==
- Atmometer (evaporimeter)
- Cryophorus
- Crystallisation
- Desalination
- Distillation
- Eddy covariance flux (a.k.a. eddy correlation, eddy flux)
- Evaporator
- Evapotranspiration
- Flash evaporation
- Heat of vaporization
- Hertz–Knudsen equation
- Hydrology (agriculture)
- Latent heat
- Latent heat flux
- Pan evaporation
- Sublimation (phase transition) (phase transfer from solid directly to gas)
- Transpiration

Phase transitions of matter
To From	Solid	Liquid	Gas	Plasma
Solid		Melting	Sublimation	
Liquid	Freezing		Vaporization	
Gas	Deposition	Condensation		Ionization
Plasma			Recombination	
