= Buffon (crater) =

Crater on the Moon

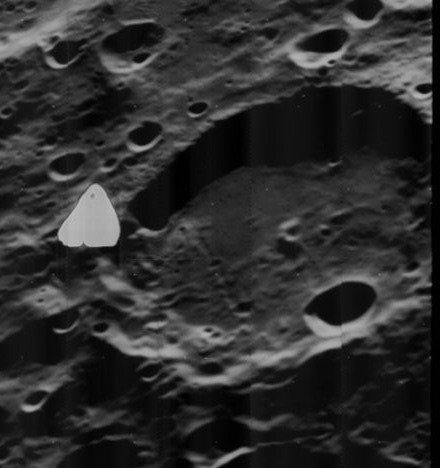
- Oblique Lunar Orbiter 5 image of most of Buffon (white triangle is blemish on original)
- Coordinates: 40.4°S 133.4°W
- Diameter: 105.76 km (65.72 mi)
- Depth: Unknown
- Colongitude: 135° at sunrise
- Formation: Nectarian
- Eponym: Comte de Buffon

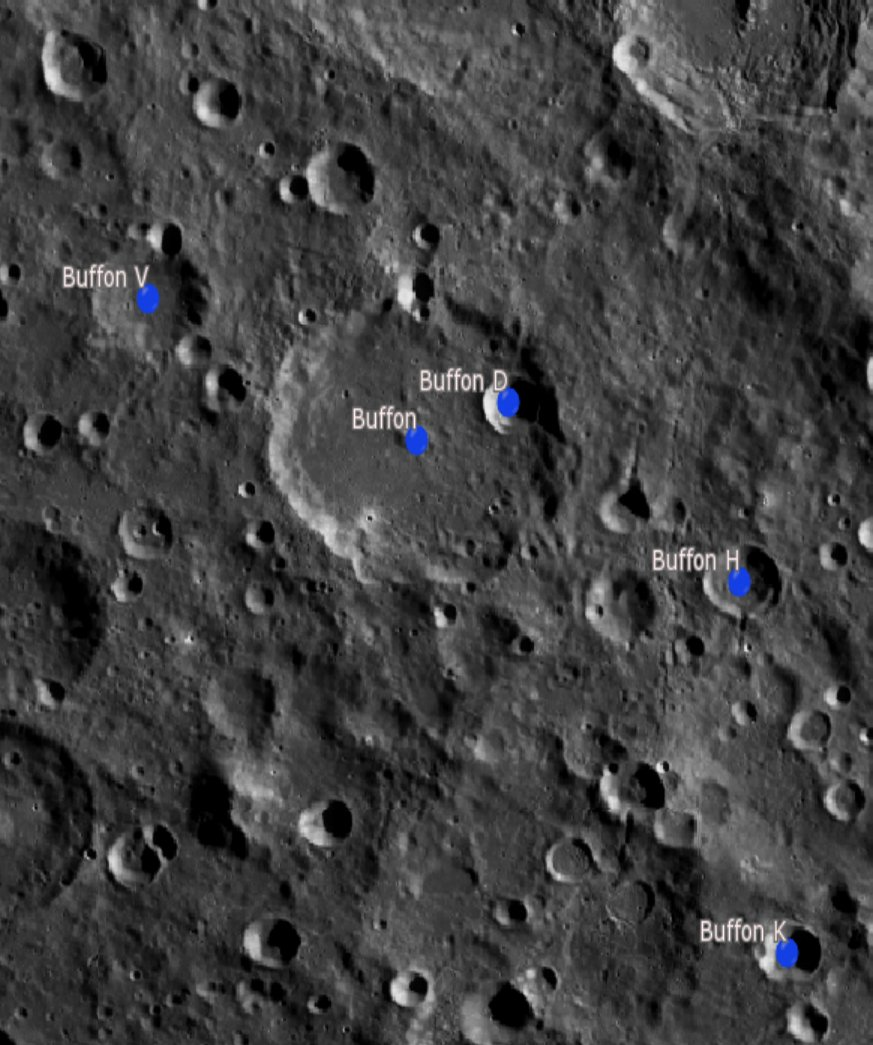
Satellite features of Buffon

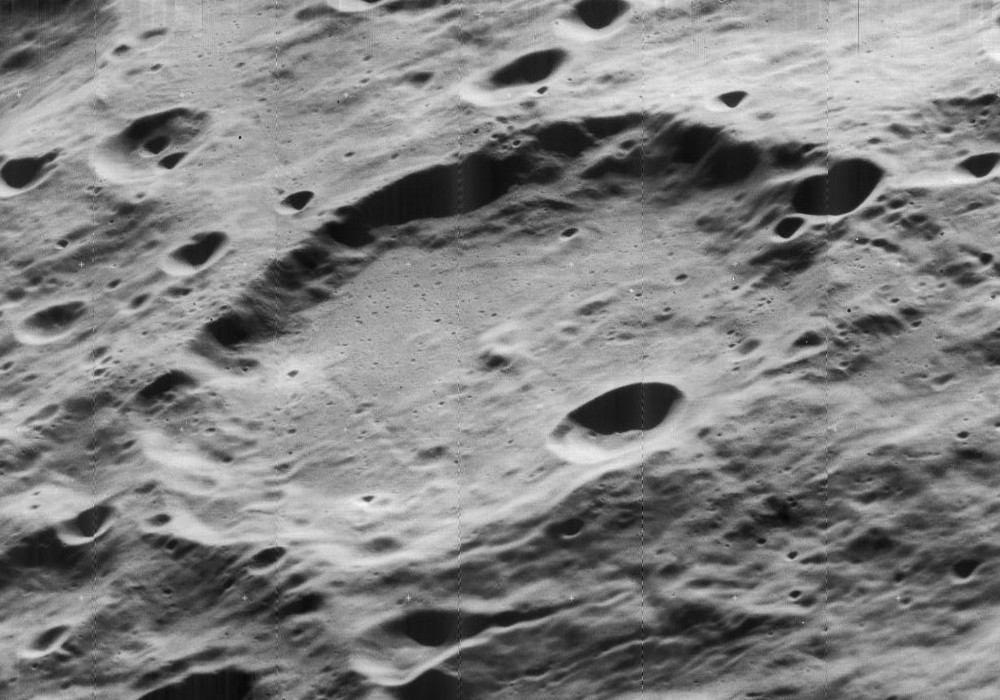
Another oblique Lunar Orbiter 5 view

Buffon is a lunar impact crater that is located on the southern hemisphere on the far side of the Moon. It lies a crater diameter south of the large walled plain called Chebyshev. To the northeast is the crater Langmuir and to the southwest is Leavitt. Buffon lies nearly at the midpoint between these formations.

This formation dates to the Nectarian period on the lunar geologic timescale. It is a worn and eroded crater, with a circular rim that can still be traced through the rugged terrain but which is irregular and rounded due to a history of lesser impacts. The most notable of these is a tiny crater which lies across the northern rim and the satellite crater Buffon D which lies along the inner eastern wall. The interior floor, although generally level, is equally rugged and irregular, particularly in the eastern half. The infrared spectrum of pure crystalline plagioclase has been identified on the central peak and the east and southwest floor.

This crater was named after French naturalist Georges-Louis Leclerc, Comte de Buffon (1707-1788). Its designation was officially adopted by the International Astronomical Union in 1970.

== Satellite craters ==
By convention these features are identified on lunar maps by placing the letter on the side of the crater midpoint that is closest to Buffon.

| Buffon | Latitude | Longitude | Diameter |
|---|---|---|---|
| D | 40.2° S | 131.7° W | 20 km |
| H | 42.3° S | 128.5° W | 26 km |
| K | 46.3° S | 128.0° W | 18 km |
| V | 39.2° S | 137.1° W | 38 km |
