= Comings =

Comings may refer to:

- David Comings (born 1935), American geneticist
- George Comings (1848-1942), American politician
- Lydia J. Newcomb Comings (1850–1946), American educator, lecturer, author
- William Comings White (1890-1965), American scientist
