= Chebyshev (crater) =

Lunar impact crater

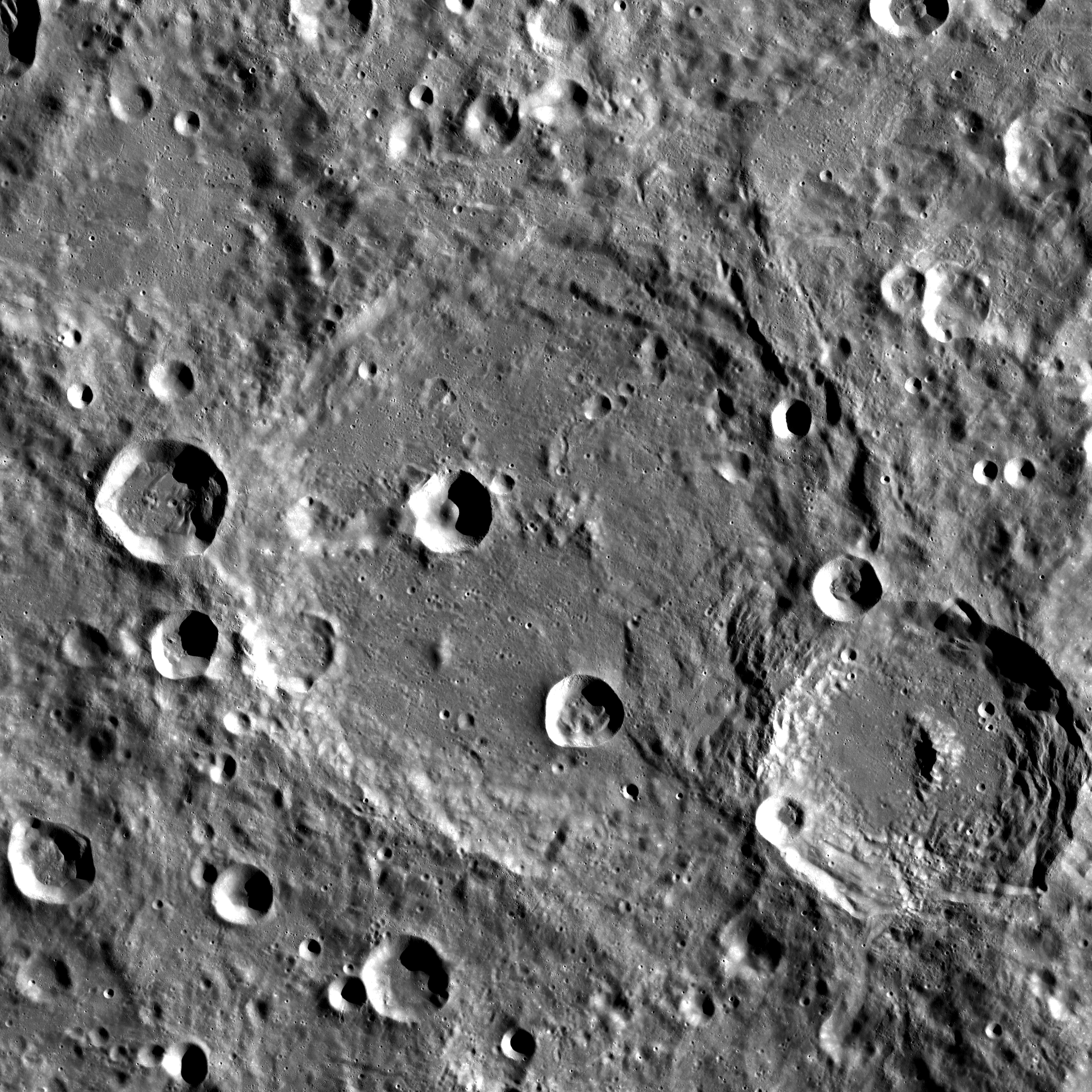
- Lunar Reconnaissance Orbiter image
- Coordinates: 34.01°S 132.88°W
- Diameter: 179.05 km (111.26 mi)
- Depth: Unknown
- Colongitude: 136° at sunrise
- Formation: Nectarian
- Eponym: Pafnuty L. Chebyshev

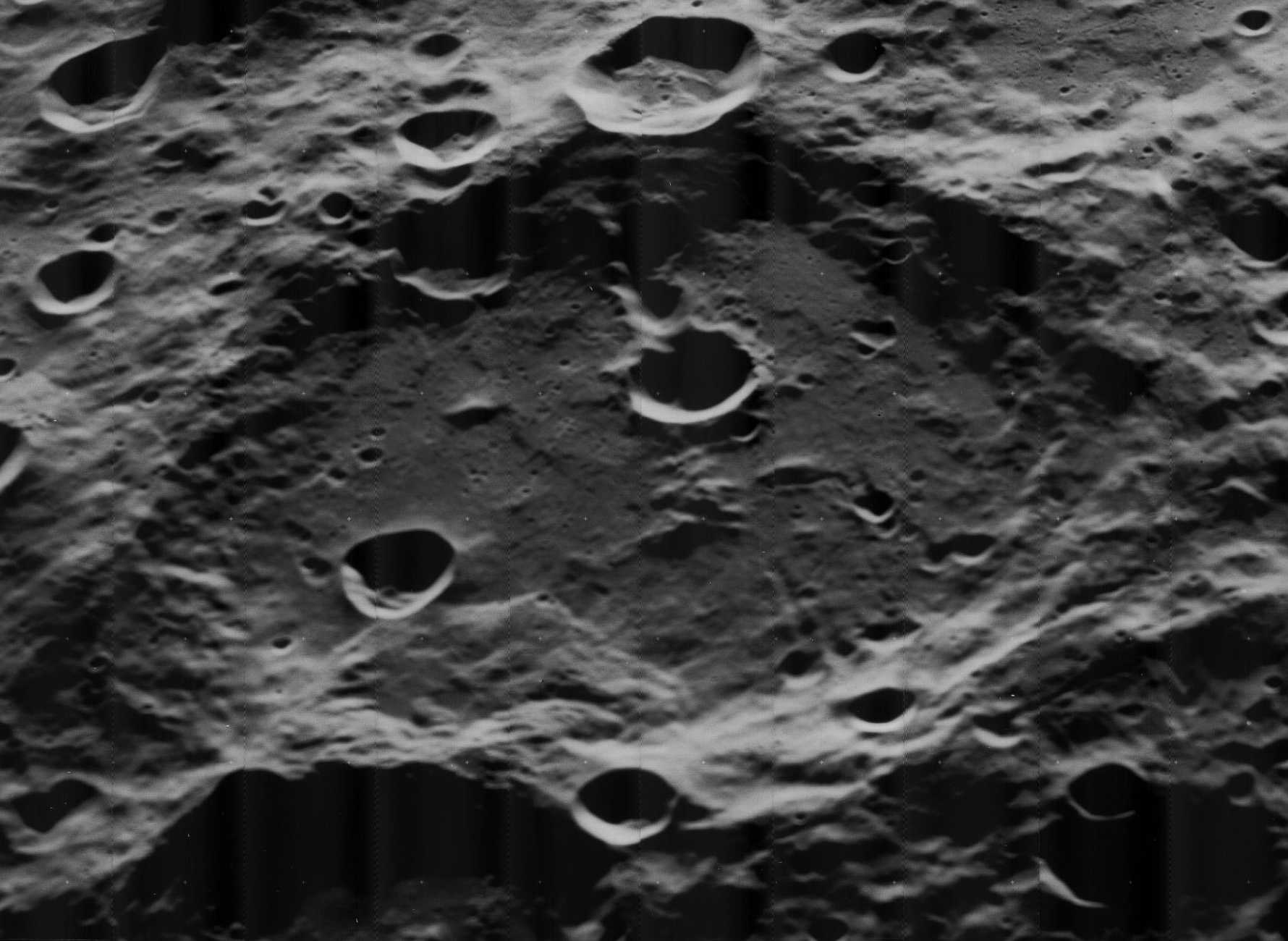
Oblique Lunar Orbiter 5 image

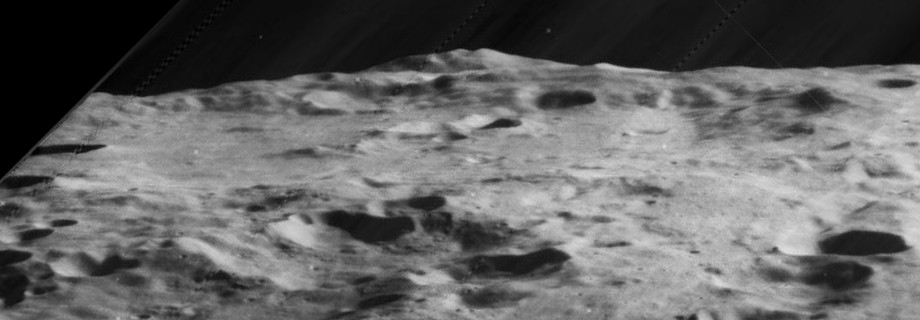
Highly oblique view also from Lunar Orbiter 5

Chebyshev is a large lunar impact crater that lies in the southern hemisphere on the far side of the Moon. The somewhat smaller crater Langmuir is intruding into the east-southeastern rim of Chebyshev, forming a chain of large craters with Brouwer on Langmuir's eastern rim.

On the lunar geologic timescale, Chebyshev dates to the Nectarian period. The outer rim of this walled plain is eroded and somewhat irregular, although much of the perimeter can still be discerned. The outer rampart of Langmuir spills into the interior, forming a rough patch in the southeastern floor. Several craters lie along the western rim, most notably Chebyshev U. The rim of this last crater is sharp-edged but somewhat irregular due to some slight outward bulges. The northern rim of Chebyshev has a wide notch extending outward about 30–40 kilometres in a V-shape. There are some other minor craters along the northeast rim, and the southern rim is a disorganized jumble.

The interior floor of Chebyshev is a mixture of relatively level plains and irregular stretches. A short chain of small craters has formed a gouge from the western inner wall reaching almost to the midpoint. There are several streaky clefts in the floor in the northeastern part of the crater. In the south is the bowl-shaped satellite crater Chebyshev N, a nearly symmetrical formation except for a slight outward bulge to the southwest. There is also an irregular crater along the inner wall to the west-southwest. The infrared spectrum of pure crystalline plagioclase has been identified on the south floor and the northeast rim.

This crater is named after Russian mathematician Pafnuty L. Chebyshev (1821–1894). Its designation was formally adopted by the International Astronomical Union in 1970.

== Satellite craters ==
By convention these features are identified on lunar maps by placing the letter on the side of the crater midpoint that is closest to Chebyshev.

Chebyshev	Coordinates	Diameter, km
C	30.29°S 127.51°W	27
N	37.75°S 134.67°W	24
U	33.29°S 137.10°W	36
V	33.53°S 133.99°W	24
Z	28.73°S 132.68°W	12

Chebyshev Z dates to the Copernican period and has a meteoritic iron-rich impact melt.

== See also ==
- 2010 Chebyshev, belt asteroid
