= Atmometer =

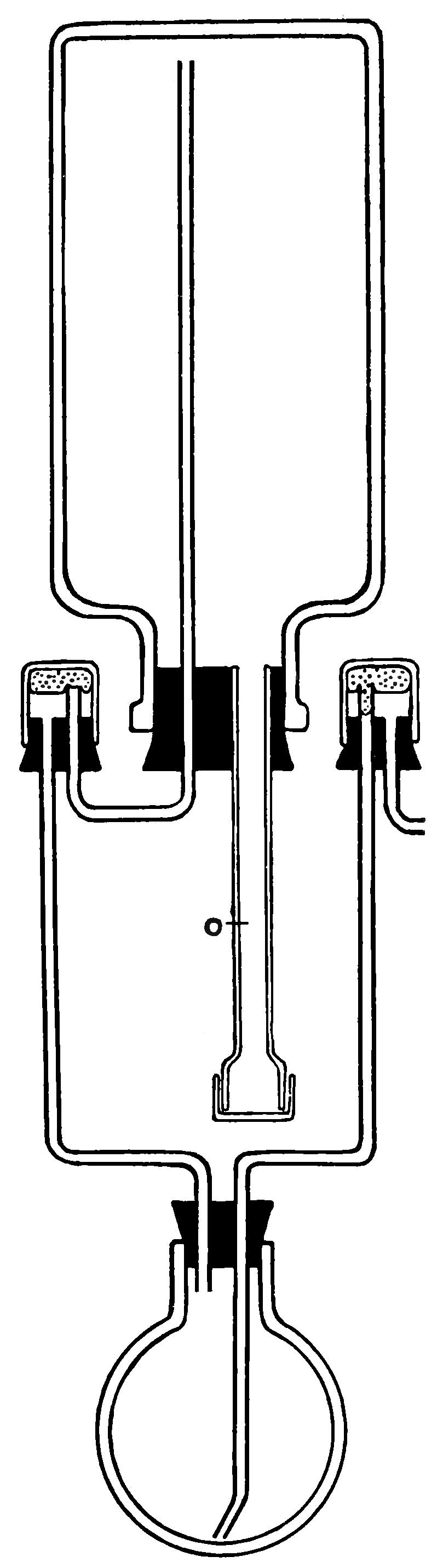
Spherical porous cup atmometer

An atmometer or evaporimeter is a scientific instrument used for measuring the rate of water evaporation from a wet surface to the atmosphere. Atmometers are mainly used by farmers and growers to measure evapotranspiration (ET) rates of crops at any field location. Evapotranspiration is a measure of all of the water that evaporates from land surfaces plus the water that transpires from plant surfaces. Based on the amount of water that does evaporate and transpire, the user can water crops correspondingly, which results in less water use and possibly increased crop yields. Companies that currently sell atmometers include C&M Meteorological Supply and Calsense.

== Design ==
An atmometer consists of a porous, ceramic plate connected to a water reservoir by a glass or plastic tube. The device stands around 1.5–2 ft (0.46–0.61 m) tall with a diameter of 3–4 in (76–102 mm). Water is drawn from the water reservoir through the tube to wet the plate. As the water on the plate evaporates, more water is drawn from the reservoir to re-wet the plate. A canvas cover made of Gore-Tex is placed over the plate to prevent anything from getting in. The canvas cover is important because it simulates the amount of solar radiation a plant absorbs under certain weather conditions and controls the rate of evaporation. Different types of canvas covers simulate different amounts of evapotranspiration rates that various plant surfaces would undergo. For example, alfalfa ET rates are estimated using the No. 54 green canvas cover, while grass ET rates are estimated using the No. 30 green canvas cover. A membrane between the plate and canvas cover prevents rain water from wetting the gauge yet allows water vapor to escape. A gauge that runs up the side of the atmometer measures the level of water (in inches) in the reservoir, which shows how much water has evaporated.

An electronic model of the atmometer is also available, which includes a data logger attached to it. A data logger automatically records the level of water every time a change due to evaporation occurs. The data that the data logger records can be downloaded onto a computer to record the results. The electronic model eliminates possible human error that could occur from reading the gauge, but costs approximately $900 while the manual model costs approximately $300.

== Use and maintenance ==
An atmometer is fairly easy to install and use. It is usually mounted on a wooden post about 40 in (1,000 mm)s above the ground in an area representative of the weather and field conditions. The plate of the atmometer should be placed in direct sunlight so the evaporation rates are not affected. It should not be placed near tall trees or buildings, as they can affect the amount of exposure that the atmometer has to environmental factors, which affect evapotranspiration rates. To measure the amount of water that has evaporated, calculate the change in water level on the gauge by subtracting the final water level from the initial water level.

== Advantages (compared to weather stations) ==
In a 2003 study conducted on the Central Coast of California, the performance of atmometers was compared with that of the more expensive weather stations. Atmometers were placed adjacent to seven weather stations around the area and weekly values were recorded for each method. The results indicated that the atmometers and weather stations yielded very similar results, both producing comparable evapotranspiration (ET) readings. Under conditions of lower evapotranspiration, the atmometers produced slightly lower ET values than those of the weather stations. Studies conducted by Colorado State University and the United States Department of Agriculture in Fort Collins produced similar results. The atmometers produced evapotranspiration values that were very close to the data calculated from weather stations. These studies show that atmometers are especially useful for areas that do not have access to nearby weather stations and/or evapotranspiration data.

- Low cost
- Easy operation
- Convenience
- No computer or power required

== Disadvantages (compared to weather stations) ==
- Potential weather damage can occur to the device
- Constant need to refill water supply
- Gauge must be read manually (only on manual model)

== See also ==
- Pan evaporation
