= Leavitt (crater) =

Crater on the Moon

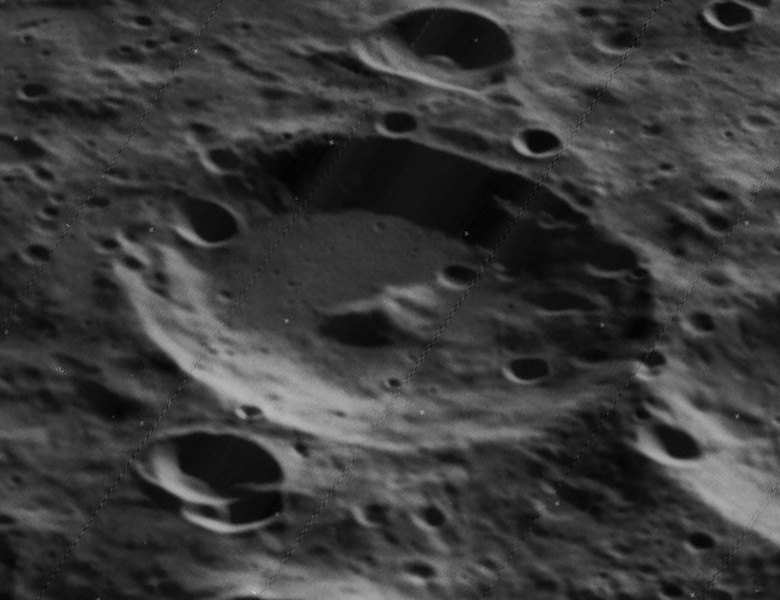
- Oblique Lunar Orbiter 5 image
- Coordinates: 44.8°S 139.3°W
- Diameter: 66 km
- Depth: Unknown
- Colongitude: 141° at sunrise
- Formation: Nectarian
- Eponym: Henrietta S. Leavitt

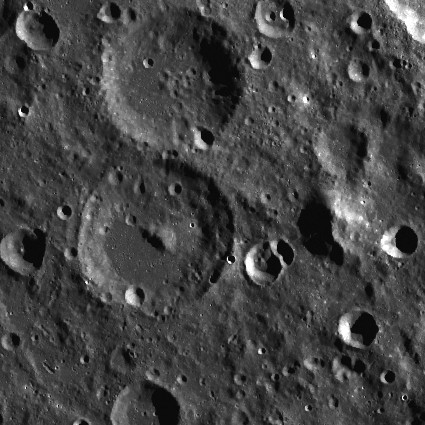
LRO image of Leavitt (left center) and Leavitt Z (top left)

Leavitt is a crater on the far side of the Moon. On the lunar geologic timescale, Leavitt dates to the Nectarian period. It is a moderately eroded crater, but only a few minor craterlets lie along the edge and interior. Most of these features lie within the northern half of the crater, but the largest lies along the southern inner wall. The crater has a low central ridge near the midpoint. There is a patch of higher-albedo material along the eastern rim, centered on a tiny craterlet.

Nearly attached to the northern outer rim is the satellite crater Leavitt Z, a formation that appears similar to Leavitt but somewhat more worn. Less than two crater diameters to the northwest of Leavitt is the huge walled plain named Apollo. To the northeast is the crater Buffon.

The crater is named after Henrietta Swan Leavitt, a Harvard astronomer who discovered over 2,400 variable stars. The crater was named to honor deaf people, like Leavitt, who have made substantial contributions to science. Leavitt was a major figure in the history of astronomy, providing the key to determining the size of the cosmos, and changing the face of modern astronomy. She propounded her theory while working as a $10.50-a-week assistant at the Harvard College Observatory.

== Satellite craters ==
By convention these features are identified on lunar maps by placing the letter on the side of the crater midpoint that is closest to Leavitt.

Leavitt	Latitude	Longitude	Diameter
Z	42.7° S	139.2° W	65 km
