= Langmuir's paradox =

Unresolved problem in plasma physics

Langmuir's paradox is an unresolved problem in plasma physics concerning the anomalous thermalization of electrons in low-pressure plasmas. The problem is named after Irving Langmuir who first reported his observations of anomalous thermalization in gas discharge plasmas in 1925.

== Description ==
In high-pressure plasmas where the electron mean free path is small relative to the spatial dimensions of the system, Coulomb collisions between electrons are frequent enough to drive the electron distribution toward thermodynamic equilibrium, resulting in an approximately Maxwellian velocity distribution. However, in low-pressure plasmas where the electron mean free path is relatively large, electron–electron collisions are too infrequent for significant energy exchange, and thermalization is not expected to occur. Despite this, electrons in low-pressure plasmas have been observed with Maxwellian velocity distributions. This anomalous result is referred to as Langmuir's paradox.

Langmuir's paradox has historically been observed near boundaries in gas discharge plasmas. At distances from the plasma sheath less than the electron mean free path, electrons with sufficiently large velocity components normal to the boundary can pass through the sheath and be lost to the wall. Consequently, the electron velocity distribution in these regions is expected to exhibit a cutoff in the tail of the population of electrons moving toward the boundary. However, observations often find a population of electrons beyond the cutoff with energies that cannot be explained by Coulomb collisions.

== Proposed solutions ==
The mechanism responsible for Langmuir's paradox is unknown. Hypotheses include oscillations of the plasma sheath and electronic polarization of neutral species.
