= William Comings White =

William Comings White (1890–1965) was an electrical engineer. He was research assistant to, and cousin of, the Nobel Prize winning chemist Irving Langmuir at the General Electric research laboratory. He was born in Brooklyn and lived most of his life in Schenectady, NY and lived on Lowell Road in the GE Plot.

He helped to develop the Kenotron and Pliotron, two- and three-electrode vacuum tubes, which could be exhausted to an exceedingly high vacuum.

He was awarded an honorary degree by Columbia University in 1948.

His papers are housed at the Schaffer Library Special Collections Department of Union College.
