= Pan evaporation =

Measurement that combines several climate elements

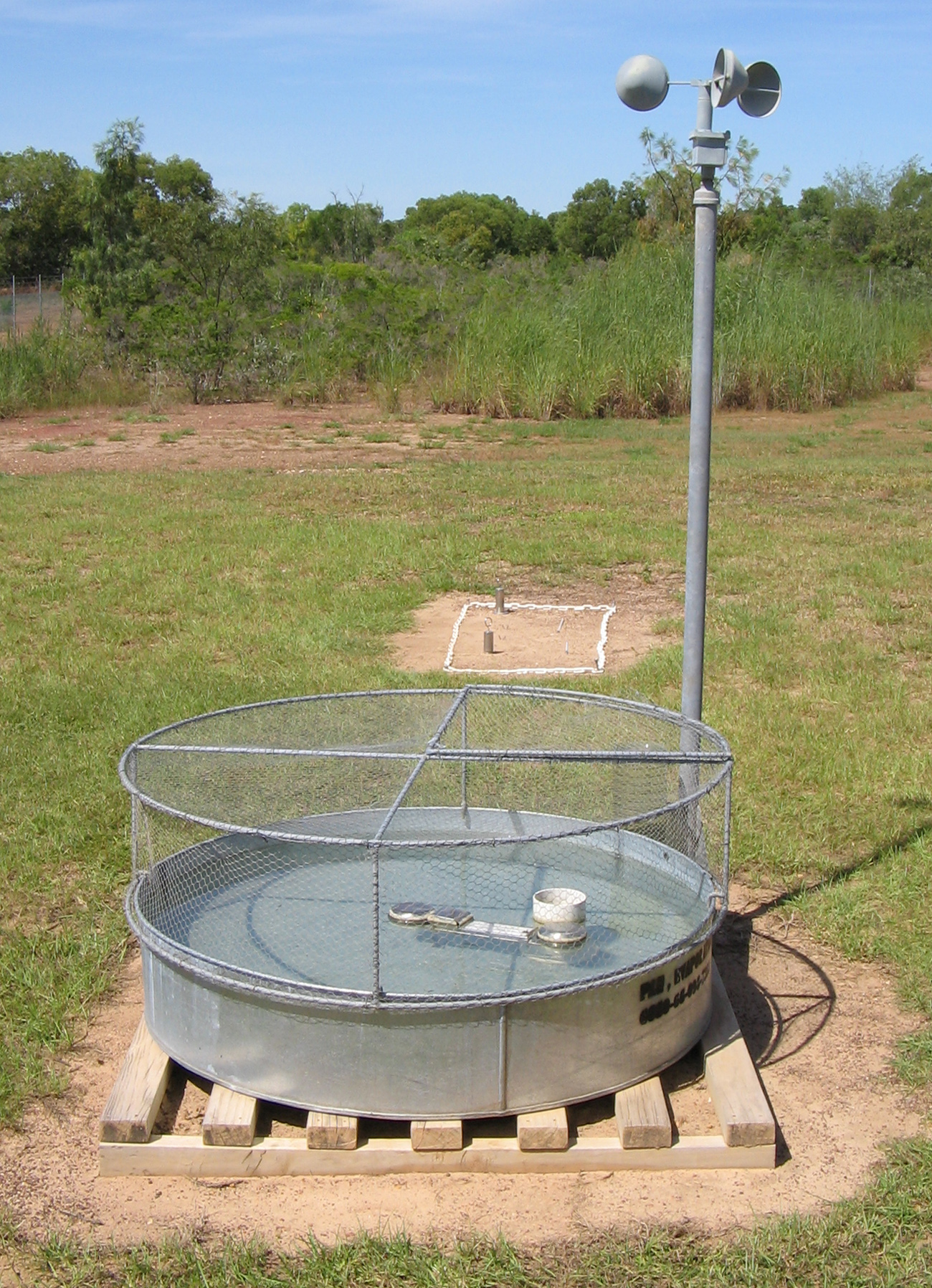
Class A evaporation pan

Pan evaporation is a measurement that combines or integrates the effects of several climate elements: temperature, humidity, rain fall, drought dispersion, solar radiation, and wind. Evaporation is greatest on hot, windy, dry, sunny days; and is greatly reduced when clouds block the sun and when air is cool, calm, and humid. Pan evaporation measurements enable farmers and ranchers to understand how much water their crops will need.

== Evaporation pan ==
An evaporation pan is used to hold water during observations for the determination of the quantity of evaporation at a given location. Such pans are of varying sizes and shapes, the most commonly used being circular or square. The best known of the pans are the "Class A" evaporation pan and the "Sunken Colorado Pan". In Europe, India and South Africa, a Symon's Pan (or sometimes Symon's Tank) is used. Often the evaporation pans are automated with water level sensors and a small weather station is located nearby.

== Standard methods ==
A variety of evaporation pans are used throughout the world. There are formulas for converting from one type of pan to another and to measures representative of the environment. Also, research has been done about the installation practices of evaporation pans so that they can make more reliable and repeatable measurements.

=== Class A evaporation pan ===
In the United States, the National Weather Service has standardized its measurements on the Class A evaporation pan, a cylinder with a diameter of 47.5 in (120.7 cm) that has a depth of 10 in (25 cm). The pan rests on a carefully leveled, wooden base and is often enclosed by a chain link fence to prevent animals drinking from it. Evaporation is measured daily as the depth of water (in inches) evaporates from the pan. The measurement day begins with the pan filled to exactly two inches (5 cm) from the pan top. At the end of 24 hours, the amount of water to refill the pan to exactly two inches from its top is measured.

If precipitation occurs in the 24-hour period, it is taken into account in calculating the evaporation. Sometimes precipitation is greater than evaporation, and measured increments of water must be dipped from the pan. Evaporation cannot be measured in a Class A pan when the pan's water surface is frozen.

The Class A Evaporation Pan is of limited use on days with rainfall events of >30mm (203mm rain gauge) unless it is emptied more than once per 24hours. Analysis of the daily rainfall and evaporation readings in areas with regular heavy rainfall events shows that almost without fail, on days with rainfall in excess of 30mm (203mm Rain Gauge) the daily evaporation is spuriously higher than other days in the same month where conditions more receptive to evaporation prevailed.

The most common and obvious error is in daily rainfall events of >55mm (203mm rain gauge) where the Class A Evaporation pan will likely overflow.

The less obvious, and therefore more concerning, is the influence of heavy or intense rainfall causing spuriously high daily evaporation totals without obvious overflow.

=== Sunken Colorado pan ===
The sunken Colorado pan is square, 0.92 m (3 ft) on a side and 0.46 m (18 in.) deep and made of unpainted galvanized iron. As the name suggests, it is buried in the ground to within about 5 cm (2 in.) of its rim. Evaporation from a Sunken Colorado Pan can be compared with a Class A pan using conversion constants. The pan coefficient, on an annual basis, is about 0.8.

=== Symons pan or tank ===
The Symons pan or tank is a standard instrument of the UK Met Office. It is a steel container 1.83 m (6 ft) on a side and 0.61 m (2 ft) deep, sunk into the ground with an above-ground rim of 7.6–10 centimetres (3.0–3.9 in) and is painted black internally. Its evaporation rate is lower than the Class A pan and conversion factors must be used.

== Decreasing trend of pan evaporation ==
Over the last 50 or so years, pan evaporation has been carefully monitored. For decades, pan evaporation measurements were not analyzed critically for long term trends. But in the 1990s scientists reported that the rate of evaporation was falling. According to data, the downward trend had been observed all over the world except in a few places where it has increased.

It is currently theorized that, all other things being equal, as the global climate warms evaporation would increase proportionately and as a result, the hydrological cycle in its most general sense is bound to accelerate. The downward trend of pan evaporation has since also been linked to a phenomenon called global dimming. In 2005 Wild et al. and Pinker et al. found that the "dimming" trend had reversed since about 1990.

Other theories suggest that measurements have not taken the local environment into account. Since the local moisture level has increased in the local terrain, less water evaporates from the pan. This leads to false measurements and must be compensated for in the data analysis. Models accounting for additional local terrain moisture match global estimates. In a different view, an analysis of pan trends in records from 154 instruments shows no coherency and pattern of statistically significant trends, with 38% decreasing, 42% no change and 20% increasing. Changes in the local environment are implicated, in which increasing tree density near the pans elevating surface friction and slowing local wind runs, reducing pan evaporation. The evaporation paradox is a result of ongoing changes in the nearby environments.

== Lake evaporation vs. pan evaporation ==
Pan evaporation is used to estimate the evaporation from lakes. There is a correlation between lake evaporation and pan evaporation. Evaporation from a natural body of water is usually at a lower rate because the body of water does not have metal sides that get hot with the sun, and while light penetration in a pan is essentially uniform, light penetration in natural bodies of water will decrease as depth increases. Most textbooks suggest multiplying the pan evaporation by 0.75 to correct for this.

== Relationship to hydrological cycle ==
"It is generally agreed that the evaporation from pans has been decreasing for the past half century over many regions of the Earth. However, the significance of this negative trend, as regards terrestrial evaporation, is still somewhat controversial, and its implications for the global hydrologic cycle remain unclear. The controversy stems from the alternative views that these evaporative changes resulted, either from global radiative dimming, or from the complementary relationship between pan and terrestrial evaporation. Actually, these factors are not mutually exclusive but act concurrently."

== See also ==
=== See also ===
- Atmometer (evaporimeter)
- Hydrology

=== External links ===
- Hastings, Nebraska, Office (15 April 2010). "Evaporation Stations". National Weather Service.
