= Sticking coefficient =

Sticking coefficient is the term used in surface physics to describe the ratio of the number of adsorbate atoms (or molecules) that adsorb, or "stick", to a surface to the total number of atoms that impinge upon that surface during the same period of time. Sometimes the symbol S_{c} is used to denote this coefficient, and its value is between 1 (all impinging atoms stick) and 0 (no atoms stick). The coefficient is a function of surface temperature, surface coverage (θ) and structural details as well as the kinetic energy of the impinging particles. The original formulation was for molecules adsorbing from the gas phase and the equation was later extended to adsorption from the liquid phase by comparison with molecular dynamics simulations. For use in adsorption from liquids the equation is expressed based on solute density (molecules per volume) rather than the pressure.

== Derivation ==
When arriving at a site of a surface, an adatom has three options. There is a probability that it will adsorb to the surface ($P_a$), a probability that it will migrate to another site on the surface ($P_m$), and a probability that it will desorb from the surface and return to the bulk gas ($P_d$). For an empty site (θ=0) the sum of these three options is unity.

$$P_a + P_m + P_d=1$$

For a site already occupied by an adatom (θ>0), there is no probability of adsorbing, and so the probabilities sum as:

$$P_d'+P_m'=1$$

For the first site visited, the P of migrating overall is the P of migrating if the site is filled plus the P of migrating if the site is empty. The same is true for the P of desorption. The P of adsorption, however, does not exist for an already filled site.

$$P_{m1}=P_m(1-\theta)+P_m'(\theta)$$

$$P_{d1}=P_d(1-\theta)+P_d'(\theta)$$

$$P_{a1}=P_a(1-\theta)$$

The P of migrating from the second site is the P of migrating from the first site and then migrating from the second site, and so we multiply the two values.

$$P_{m2}=P_{m1} \times P_{m1}=P_{m1}^2$$

Thus the sticking probability ($s_c$) is the P of sticking of the first site, plus the P of migrating from the first site and then sticking to the second site, plus the P of migrating from the second site and then sticking at the third site etc.

$$s=P_a(1-\theta)+P_{m1}P_a(1-\theta)+P_{m1}^2P_a(1-\theta)...$$

$$s=P_a(1-\theta)\sum_{n=0}^{\infin} P_{m1}^n$$

There is an identity we can make use of.

$$\sum_{n=0}^{\infin} x^n =\frac{1}{1-x}\forall x<1$$

$$\therefore s=P_a(1-\theta)\frac{1}{1-P_{m1}}$$

The sticking coefficient when the coverage is zero $s_0$ can be obtained by simply setting $\theta=0$. We also remember that

$$1-P_{m1}=P_a+P_d$$

$$s_0=\frac{P_a}{P_a+P_d}$$

$$\frac{s}{s_0}=\frac{P_a(1-\theta)}{1-P_{m1}}\frac{P_a+P_d}{P_a}$$

If we just look at the P of migration at the first site, we see that it is certainty minus all other possibilities.

$$P_{m1}=1-P_d(1-\theta)-P_d'(\theta)-P_a(1-\theta)$$

Using this result, and rearranging, we find:

$$\frac{s}{s_0}=\left[1+\frac{P_d'\theta}{(P_a+P_d)(1-\theta)}\right]^{-1}$$

$$\frac{s}{s_0}=\left[1+\frac{K\theta}{1-\theta}\right]^{-1}$$

$$K\overset{\underset{\mathrm{def}}{}}{=}\frac{P_d'}{P_a+P_d}$$
