= Langmuir–Taylor detector =

Ionization detector

A Langmuir–Taylor detector, also called surface ionization detector or hot wire detector, is a kind of ionization detector used in mass spectrometry, developed by John Taylor based on the work of Irving Langmuir and K. H. Kingdon.

== Construction ==
This detector usually consists of a heated thin filament or ribbon of a metal with a high work function (typically tungsten or rhenium). Neutral atoms or molecules that strike the filament can boil off as positive ions in a process known as surface ionization, and these may be either measured as a current or detected, individually, using an electron multiplier and particle counting electronics.

== Applications ==
This detector is mostly used with alkali atoms, having a low ionization potential, with applications in mass spectrometry and atomic clocks.
