= Brouwer (crater) =

Lunar impact crater

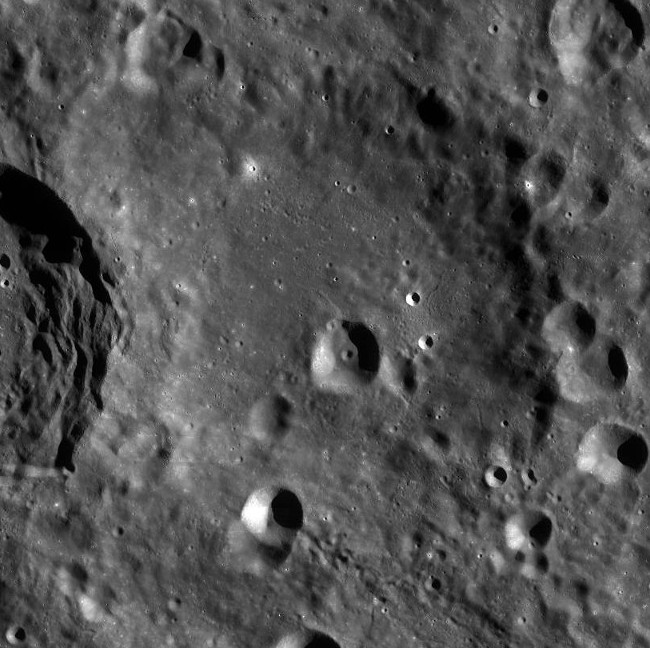
- LRO WAC image
- Coordinates: 36.2°S 126.0°W
- Diameter: 119.60 km (74.32 mi)
- Depth: Unknown
- Colongitude: 127° at sunrise
- Formation: Nectarian or Pre-Nectarian
- Eponym: Dirk Brouwer; Luitzen E. J. Brouwer

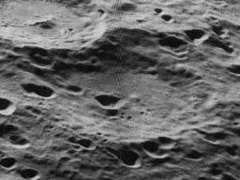
Oblique Lunar Orbiter 5 image, facing west

Brouwer is a large lunar impact crater that is located in the southern hemisphere on the far side of the Moon. Intruding into the western rim of Brouwer is the younger and somewhat smaller crater Langmuir. Further to the east-southeast is the larger feature Blackett, a walled plain.

This formation dates to the Nectarian or possibly Pre-Nectarian period of the lunar geologic timescale. It is an old crater with a rim that has been heavily worn due to subsequent impacts. Parts of the rim to the east and north can still be traced in the irregular terrain, but the southern rim is almost completely disintegrated.

The interior floor is rough in the southeastern half, and somewhat more level and less rough to the northwest. Lying just to the southeast of the crater midpoint is the satellite crater Brouwer H. If the floor once possessed a central peak, it may have been overlaid by this last-mentioned formation.

This crater is named after American astronomer Dirk Brouwer (1902–1966) and Dutch mathematician Luitzen E. J. Brouwer (1881–1968). Its designation was officially adopted by the International Astronomical Union in 1970.

== Satellite craters ==
By convention these features are identified on lunar maps by placing the letter on the side of the crater midpoint that is closest to Brouwer.

Brouwer	Latitude	Longitude	Diameter
C	33.4° S	122.1° W	26 km
H	35.9° S	124.4° W	19 km
P	38.6° S	126.5° W	29 km
