= Atomic hydrogen welding =

Arc welding process under an H2 atmosphere

An atomic hydrogen blowpipe, circa 1930.

Atomic hydrogen welding (AHW or Athydo) is an arc welding process that uses an arc between two tungsten electrodes in a shielding atmosphere of hydrogen. The process was invented by Irving Langmuir in the course of his studies of atomic hydrogen. The electric arc efficiently breaks up the hydrogen molecules, which later recombine with tremendous release of heat, reaching temperatures from 3,400 to 4,000 °C (6,150 to 7,230 °F). Without the arc, an oxyhydrogen torch can only reach 2,800 °C (5,070 °F). This is the third-hottest flame after dicyanoacetylene at 4,987 °C (9,009 °F) and cyanogen at 4,525 °C (8,177 °F). An acetylene torch merely reaches 3,300 °C (5,970 °F). This device may be called an atomic hydrogen torch, nascent hydrogen torch or Langmuir torch. The process was also known as arc-atom welding.

The heat produced by this torch is sufficient to weld tungsten (3,422 °C (6,192 °F)), the most refractory metal. The presence of hydrogen also acts as a shielding gas, preventing oxidation and contamination by carbon, nitrogen or oxygen, which can severely damage the properties of many metals. It eliminates the need of flux for this purpose.

The arc is maintained independently of the workpiece or parts being welded. The hydrogen gas is normally diatomic (H_{2}), but where the temperatures are over 6,000 °C (10,830 °F) near the arc, the hydrogen breaks down into its atomic form, absorbing a large amount of heat from the arc. When the hydrogen strikes a relatively cold surface (i.e. the weld zone), it recombines into its diatomic form, releasing the energy associated with the formation of that bond. The energy in AHW can be varied easily by changing the distance between the arc stream and the workpiece surface.

In atomic hydrogen welding, filler metal may or may not be used. In this process, the arc is maintained entirely independent of the work or parts being welded. The work is a part of the electrical circuit only to the extent that a portion of the arc comes in contact with the work, at which time a voltage exists between the work and each electrode.

This process is being replaced by gas metal-arc welding, mainly because of the availability of inexpensive inert gases.

== See also ==
- Oxy-fuel welding and cutting#Hydrogen
