= Langmuir (unit) =

Unit of exposure to a surface

The langmuir (symbol: L) is a unit of exposure (or gas dose) to a surface (e.g. of a crystal) and is used in ultra-high vacuum (UHV) surface physics to study the adsorption of gases. It is a practical unit, and is not dimensionally homogeneous, and so is used only in this field. It is named after American physicist Irving Langmuir.

== Definition ==
The langmuir is defined by multiplying the pressure of the gas by the time of exposure. One langmuir corresponds to an exposure of 10^{−6} Torr during one second. For example, exposing a surface to a gas pressure of 10^{−8} Torr for 100 seconds corresponds to 1 L. Similarly, keeping the pressure of oxygen gas at 2.5·10^{−6} Torr for 40 seconds will give a dose of 100 L.

== Conversion ==
Since both different pressures and exposure times can give the same langmuir (see definition) it can be difficult to convert Langmuir (L) to exposure pressure × time (Torr·s) and vice versa. The following equation can be used to convert between the two easily:
$$xy[{\rm L}]=x\times 10^{-n}[{\rm Torr}]\cdot y\times 10^{n-6}[{\rm s}]$$
Here, $x$ and $y$ are any two numbers whose product equals the desired Langmuir value, $n$ is an integer allowing different magnitudes of pressure or exposure time to be used in conversion. The units are represented in the [square brackets]. Using the prior example, for a dose of 100 L a pressure of 2.5 × 10^{−6} Torr can be applied for 40 seconds, thus, $x = 2.5$, $y = 40$ and $n = 6$. However, this dose could also be gained with 8 × 10^{−8} Torr for 1250 seconds, here $x = 8$, $y = 12.5$, $n=8$. In both scenarios $xy = 100$.

== Derivation ==
Exposure of a surface in surface physics is a type of fluence, that is the integral of number flux (J_{N}) with respect to exposed time (t) to give a number of particles per unit area (Φ):

$$\Phi = \int{J_N} \, {\rm d}t.$$

The number flux for an ideal gas, that is the number of gas molecules passing through (in a single direction) a surface of unit area in unit time, can be derived from kinetic theory:

$$J_N = \frac{C\bar u}{4},$$

where C is the number density of the gas, and $\bar u$ is the mean speed of the molecules (not the root-mean-square speed, although the two are related). The number density of an ideal gas depends on the thermodynamic temperature (T) and the pressure (p):

$$C = \frac{N}{V} = \frac{p}{kT}.$$

The mean speed of the gas molecules can also be derived from kinetic theory:

$$\bar u = \sqrt{\frac{8kT}{\pi m}},$$

where m is the mass of a gas molecule. Hence

$$J_N = \frac{C\bar u}{4} = p\sqrt{\frac{1}{2\pi kTm}}.$$

The proportionality between number flux and pressure is only strictly valid for a given temperature and a given molecular mass of adsorbing gas. However, the dependence is only on the square roots of m and T. Gas adsorption experiments typically operate around ambient temperature with light gases. Hence, the langmuir remains useful as a practical unit.

== Usage ==
Assuming that every gas molecule hitting the surface sticks to it (that is, the sticking coefficient is 1), one langmuir (1 L) leads to a coverage of about one monolayer of the adsorbed gas molecules on the surface. In general, the sticking coefficient varies depending on the reactivity of the surface and the molecules, so that the langmuir gives a lower limit of the time it needs to completely cover a surface.

This also illustrates why ultra-high vacuum (UHV) must be used to study solid-state surfaces, nanostructures or even single molecules. The typical time to perform physical experiments on sample surfaces is in the range of one to several hours. To keep the surface free of contaminations, the pressure of the residual gas in a UHV chamber should be below 10^{−10} Torr.
