= Hertz–Knudsen equation =

Surface chemistry evaporation rate equation

In surface chemistry, the Hertz–Knudsen equation, also known as Knudsen–Langmuir equation describes evaporation rates, named after Heinrich Hertz and Martin Knudsen.

== Definition ==
=== Non-dissociative adsorption (Langmuirian adsorption) ===
The Hertz–Knudsen equation describes the non-dissociative adsorption of a gas molecule on a surface by expressing the variation of the number of molecules impacting on the surfaces per unit of time as a function of the pressure of the gas and other parameters which characterise both the gas phase molecule and the surface:

$$\frac{\mathrm{d}N}{A \mathrm{d}t} \equiv \varphi = \frac{\alpha p}{\sqrt{2\pi m k_\text{B} T}} =  \frac{\alpha p  N_A}{\sqrt{2\pi M RT}},$$

where:

Quantity	Description
A	Surface area (in m^{2})
N	Number of gas molecules
t	Time (in s)
$\varphi$	Flux of the gas molecules (in m^{−2} s^{−1})
α	Anomalous evaporation coefficient, 0 ≤ α ≤ 1, to match experimental results to theoretical predictions (Knudsen noted that experimental fluxes are lower than theoretical fluxes)
p	The gas pressure (in Pa)
M	Molar mass (in kg mol^{−1})
m	Mass of a particle (in kg)
k_{B}	Boltzmann constant
T	Temperature (in K)
R	Gas constant (J mol^{−1} K^{−1})
N_{A}	Avogadro constant (mol^{−1})

Since the equation result has the units of s^{−1} per area, it can be assimilated to a rate constant for the adsorption process.

== See also ==
- Langmuir (unit)
