= Langmuir states =

In quantum mechanics Langmuir states are certain quantum states of Helium that in the classical limit correspond to two parallel circular orbits of electrons one above the other and with the nucleus in between. They are constructed in analogy to circular states of Hydrogen when the electron has the maximum angular momentum and moves on the circle. Because of the magic value of the Helium nucleus charge 2e the triangle nucleus-electron-electron which sweeps the configuration space during the circular motion is equilateral.
