= Langmuir (crater) =

Crater on the Moon

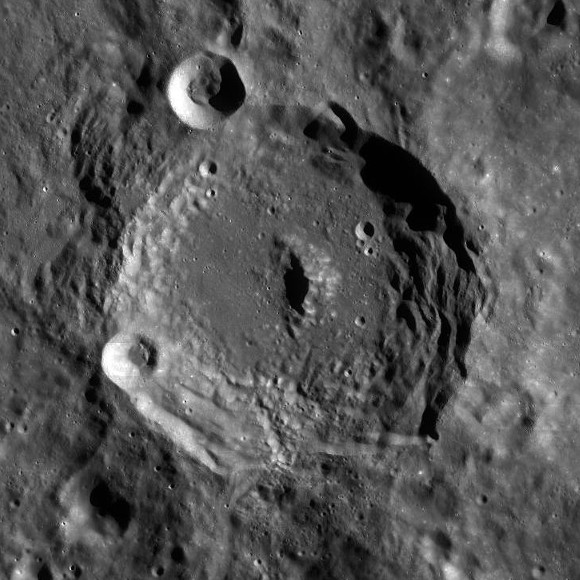
- LRO WAC image
- Coordinates: 35.7°S 128.4°W
- Diameter: 91 km
- Depth: Unknown
- Colongitude: 130° at sunrise
- Formation: Imbrian
- Eponym: Irving Langmuir

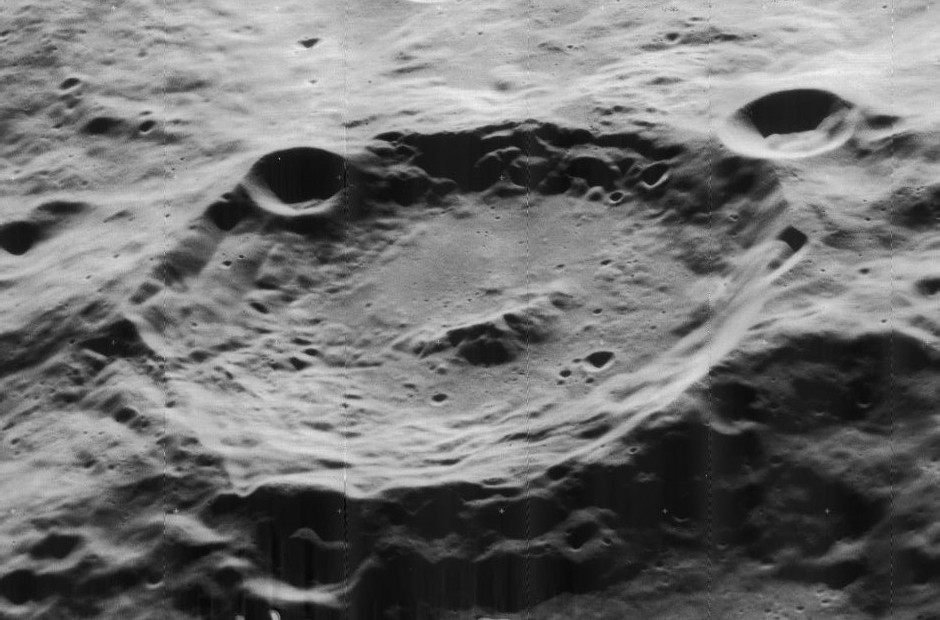
Oblique Lunar Orbiter 5 image, facing west

Langmuir is an impact crater on the Moon's far side. It is located in a region to the southwest of the Mare Orientale impact basin. Langmuir is bracketed between two larger craters, with Chebyshev to the west-northwest and Brouwer to the east. It partly overlaps the rims of these two craters, making it the youngest of the three. The outer rampart of ejecta from Langmuir partly covers the southeast interior floor of Chebyshev.

This formation is dated to the Imbrian period of the lunar geologic timescale. It has not been heavily eroded, and many of its original features remain intact and sharply defined. The rim to the west is somewhat disrupted due to having overlaid the rim of the larger Chebyshev. In a coincidental arrangement, a small crater is situated across the rim edge at the northern end of where it joins with Chebyshev, and a smaller crater lies at the southern end of this merger.

The inner wall of Langmuir contains some minor terrace structures and displays some appearance of slumping along the southwestern edge. The inner wall in the southern half of the crater is wider than elsewhere, and is nearly twice as wide as the inner wall along the northern edge. As a result, the interior floor is offset to the north. There is a central peak formation on the floor, but it is located to the northeast of the midpoint. Anorthosite with a very low mafic abundance has been detected in this rise. The floor is relatively level in the western half, but more uneven in the east.
