= Irving Langmuir =

American chemist and physicist (1881–1957)

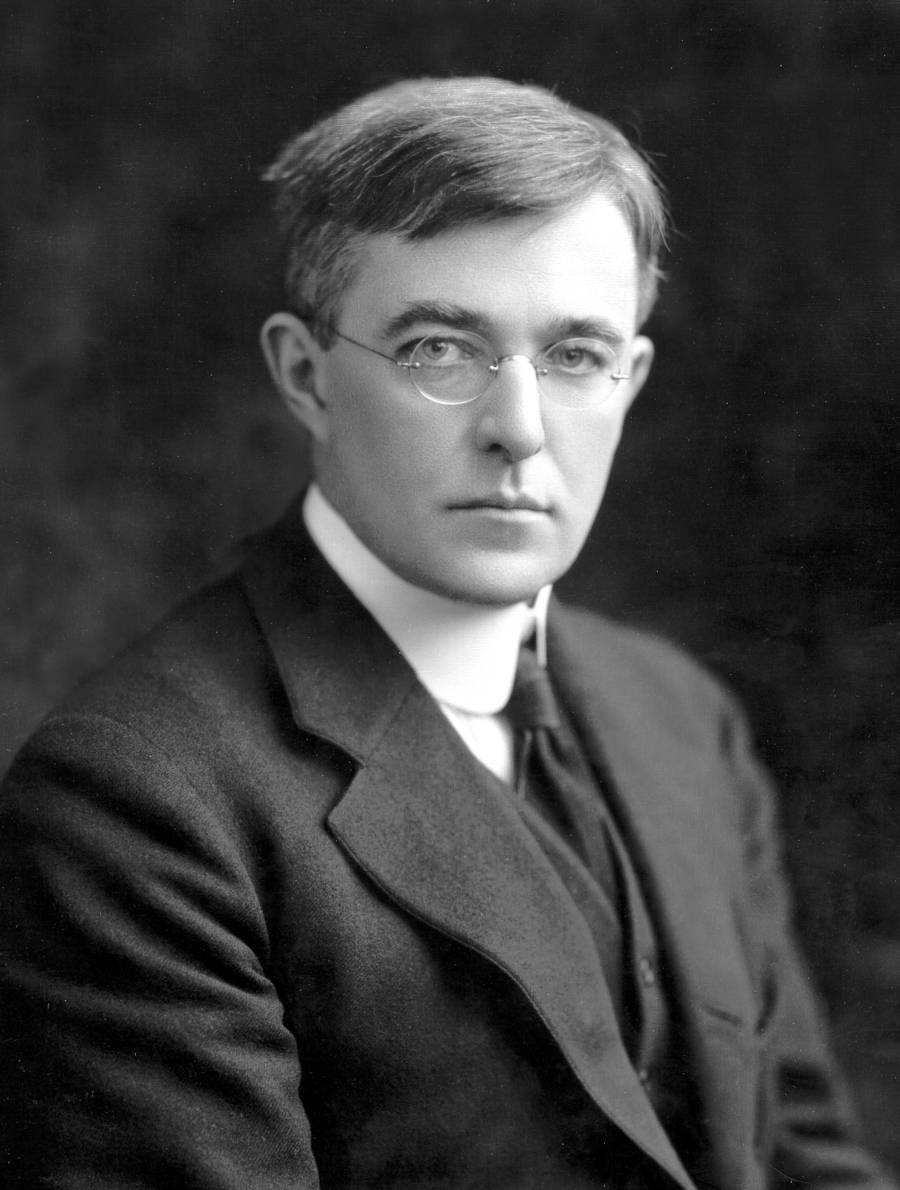
- Langmuir, likely circa 1910
- Born: January 31, 1881; Brooklyn, New York, U.S.
- Died: August 16, 1957 (aged 76); Woods Hole, Massachusetts, U.S.
- Education: Columbia University; University of Göttingen
- Known for: Inventor of the high-vacuum tube; Langmuir isotherm; Langmuir waves; Langmuir's paradox; d-square law
- Awards: William H. Nichols Medal (1915, 1920); Hughes Medal (1918); Perkin Medal (1928); Willard Gibbs Award (1930); Nobel Prize in Chemistry (1932); Franklin Medal (1934); Faraday Lectureship Prize (1939); Faraday Medal (1944); John J. Carty Award (1950)
- Scientific career
- Fields: Chemistry; Physics
- Workplaces: Stevens Institute of Technology; General Electric
- Thesis: Ueber partielle Wiedervereinigung dissociierter Gase im Verlauf einer Abkühlung (1909)
- Doctoral advisor: Friedrich Dolezalek
- Other academic advisors: Walther Nernst

Irving Langmuir (/ˈlæŋmjʊər/; January 31, 1881 – August 16, 1957) was an American chemist, physicist, and metallurgical engineer. He was awarded the Nobel Prize in Chemistry in 1932 for his work in surface chemistry.

Langmuir's most famous publication is the 1919 article "The Arrangement of Electrons in Atoms and Molecules" in which, building on Gilbert N. Lewis's cubical atom theory and Walther Kossel's chemical bonding theory, he outlined his "concentric theory of atomic structure". Langmuir became embroiled in a priority dispute with Lewis over this work; Langmuir's presentation skills were largely responsible for the popularization of the theory, although the credit for the theory itself belongs mostly to Lewis. While at General Electric from 1909 to 1950, Langmuir advanced several fields of physics and chemistry, inventing the gas-filled incandescent lamp and the hydrogen welding technique. The Langmuir Laboratory for Atmospheric Research near Socorro, New Mexico, was named in his honor, as was the American Chemical Society journal for surface science called Langmuir.

== Biography ==
=== Early years ===
Irving Langmuir was born in Brooklyn, New York, on January 31, 1881. He was the third of the four children of Charles Langmuir and Sadie, née Comings. During his childhood, Langmuir's parents encouraged him to carefully observe nature and to keep a detailed record of his various observations. When Irving was eleven, it was discovered that he had poor eyesight. When this problem was corrected, details that had previously eluded him were revealed, and his interest in the complications of nature was heightened.

During his childhood, Langmuir was influenced by his older brother, Arthur Langmuir. Arthur was a research chemist who encouraged Irving to be curious about nature and how things work. Arthur helped Irving set up his first chemistry lab in the corner of his bedroom, and he was content to answer the myriad questions that Irving would pose. Langmuir's hobbies included mountaineering, skiing, piloting his own plane, and classical music. In addition to his professional interest in the politics of atomic energy, he was concerned about wilderness conservation.

=== Education ===
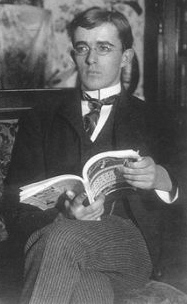
Langmuir c. 1900

Langmuir attended several schools and institutes in America and Paris (1892–1895) before graduating high school from Chestnut Hill Academy (1898), an elite private school located in the affluent Chestnut Hill area in Philadelphia. He graduated with a Bachelor of Science degree in metallurgical engineering (Met.E.) from the Columbia University School of Mines in 1903. He earned his PhD in 1906 under Friedrich Dolezalek in Göttingen, for research done using the "Nernst glower", an electric lamp invented by Nernst. His doctoral thesis was entitled "On the Partial Recombination of Dissolved Gases During Cooling" (German: Ueber partielle Wiedervereinigung dissociierter Gase im Verlauf einer Abkühlung). He later did postgraduate work in chemistry. Langmuir then taught at Stevens Institute of Technology in Hoboken, New Jersey, until 1909, when he began working at the General Electric research laboratory (Schenectady, New York).

=== Research ===
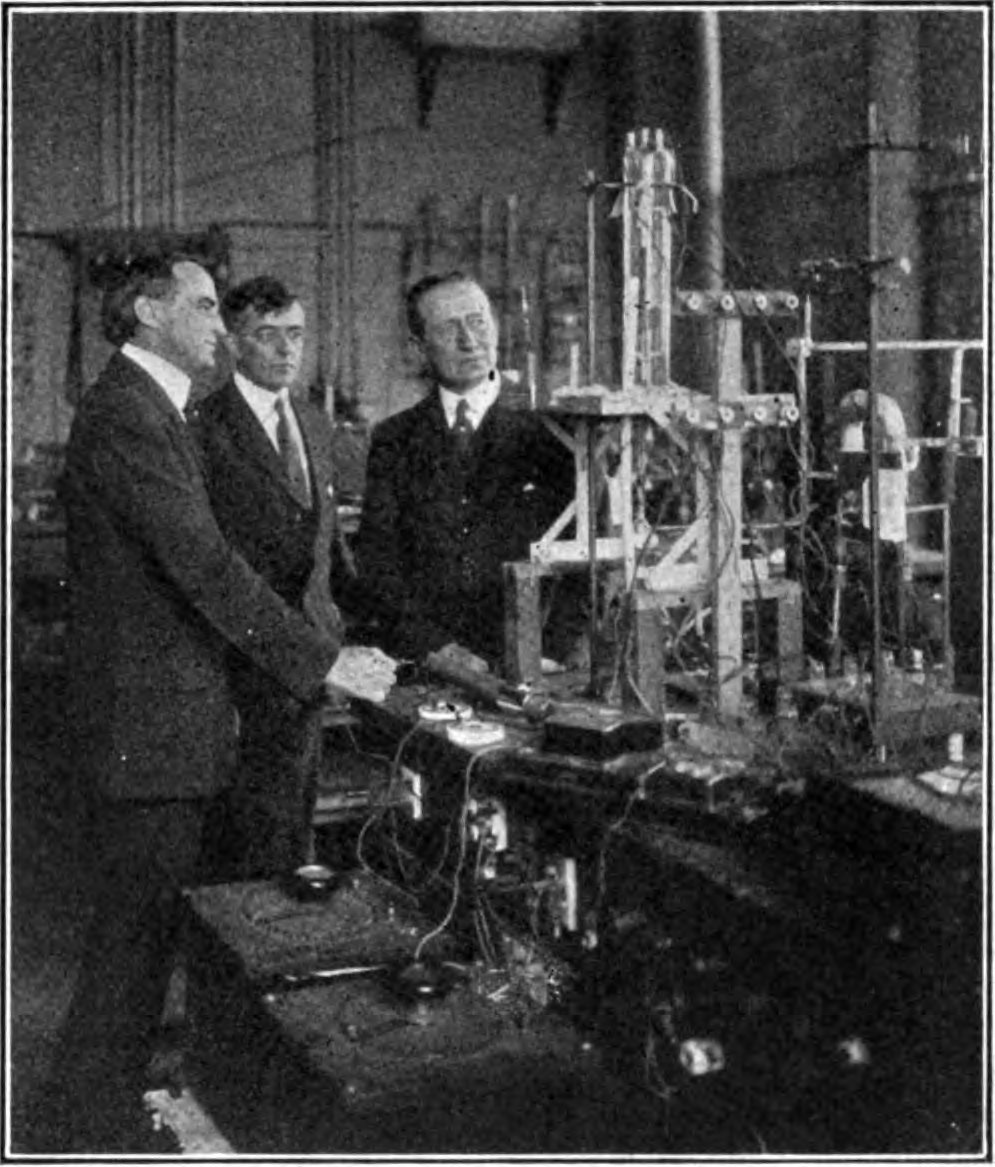
Langmuir (center) in 1922 in his lab at GE, showing radio pioneer Guglielmo Marconi (right) a new 20 kW triode tube

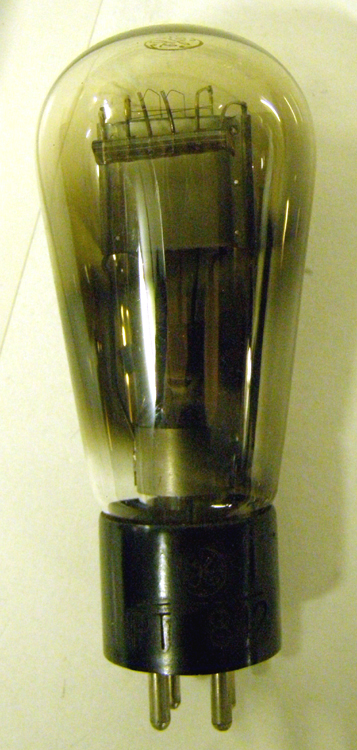
General Electric Company Pliotron

His initial contributions to science came from his study of light bulbs (a continuation of his PhD work). His first major development was the improvement of the diffusion pump, which ultimately led to the invention of the high-vacuum rectifier and amplifier tubes. A year later, he and colleague Lewi Tonks discovered that the lifetime of a tungsten filament could be greatly lengthened by filling the bulb with an inert gas, such as argon, the critical factor (overlooked by other researchers) being the need for extreme cleanliness in all stages of the process. He also discovered that twisting the filament into a tight coil improved its efficiency. These were important developments in the history of the incandescent light bulb. His work in surface chemistry began at this point, when he discovered that molecular hydrogen introduced into a tungsten-filament bulb dissociated into atomic hydrogen and formed a layer one atom thick on the surface of the bulb.

His assistant in vacuum tube research was his cousin William Comings White.

As he continued to study filaments in vacuum and different gas environments, he began to study the emission of charged particles from hot filaments (thermionic emission). He was one of the first scientists to work with plasmas, and he was the first to call these ionized gases by that name because they reminded him of blood plasma. Langmuir and Tonks discovered electron density waves in plasmas that are now known as Langmuir waves.

He introduced the concept of electron temperature and in 1924 invented the diagnostic method for measuring both temperature and density with an electrostatic probe, now called a Langmuir probe and commonly used in plasma physics. The current of a biased probe tip is measured as a function of bias voltage to determine the local plasma temperature and density. He also discovered atomic hydrogen, which he put to use by inventing the atomic hydrogen welding process; the first plasma weld ever made. Plasma welding has since been developed into gas tungsten arc welding.

In 1917, he published a paper on the chemistry of oil films that later became the basis for the award of the 1932 Nobel Prize in chemistry. Langmuir theorized that oils consisting of an aliphatic chain with a hydrophilic end group (perhaps an alcohol or acid) were oriented as a film one molecule thick upon the surface of water, with the hydrophilic group down in the water and the hydrophobic chains clumped together on the surface. The thickness of the film could be easily determined from the known volume and area of the oil, which allowed investigation of the molecular configuration before spectroscopic techniques were available.

=== Later years ===
Following World War I Langmuir contributed to atomic theory and the understanding of atomic structure by defining the modern concept of valence shells and isotopes.

Langmuir was president of the Institute of Radio Engineers in 1923.

Based on his work at General Electric, John B. Taylor developed a detector ionizing beams of alkali metals, called nowadays the Langmuir-Taylor detector. In 1927, he was one of the participants of the fifth Solvay Conference on Physics that took place at the International Solvay Institute for Physics in Belgium.

He joined Katharine B. Blodgett to study thin films and surface adsorption. They introduced the concept of a monolayer (a layer of material one molecule thick) and the two-dimensional physics which describe such a surface. In 1932 he received the Nobel Prize in Chemistry "for his discoveries and investigations in surface chemistry." In 1938, Langmuir's scientific interests began to turn to atmospheric science and meteorology. One of his first ventures, although tangentially related, was a refutation of the claim of entomologist Charles H. T. Townsend that the deer botfly flew at speeds of over 800 miles per hour. Langmuir estimated the fly's speed at 25 miles per hour.

After observing windrows of drifting seaweed in the Sargasso Sea he discovered a wind-driven surface circulation in the sea. It is now called the Langmuir circulation.

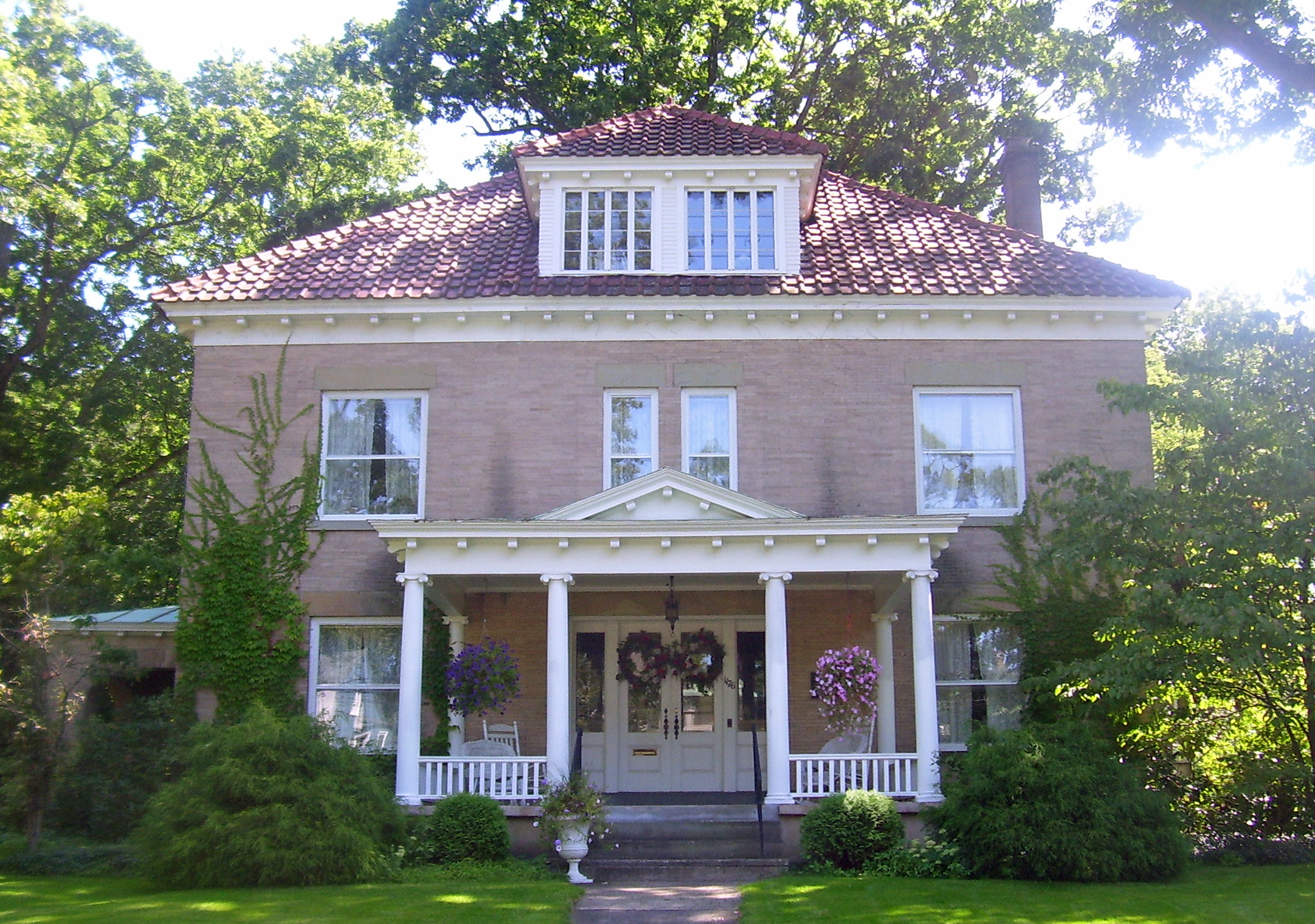
Langmuir's house in Schenectady

During World War II, Langmuir and Research Associate Vincent J Schaefer worked on improving naval sonar for submarine detection, and later to develop protective smoke screens and methods for deicing aircraft wings. This research led him to theorize and then demonstrate in the laboratory and in the atmosphere, that the introduction of ice nuclei dry ice and silver iodide into a sufficiently moist cloud of low temperature (supercooled water) could induce precipitation (cloud seeding); though in frequent practice, particularly in Australia and the People's Republic of China, the efficiency of this technique remains controversial today.

In 1953 Langmuir coined the term "pathological science", describing research conducted with accordance to the scientific method, but tainted by unconscious bias or subjective effects. This is in contrast to pseudoscience, which has no pretense of following the scientific method. In his original speech, he presented ESP and flying saucers as examples of pathological science; since then, the label has been applied to polywater and cold fusion.

His house in Schenectady, was designated a National Historic Landmark in 1976.

=== Personal life ===
Langmuir was married to Marion Mersereau (1883–1971) in 1912 with whom he adopted two children: Kenneth and Barbara. After a short illness, he died in Woods Hole, Massachusetts from a heart attack on August 16, 1957. His obituary ran on the front page of The New York Times.

On his religious views, Langmuir was an agnostic.

=== In the arts ===
Langmuir's grandson, filmmaker Roger R Summerhayes, created a 57-minute documentary in 1999 called Langmuir's World.

According to author Kurt Vonnegut, Langmuir was the inspiration for his fictional scientist Dr. Felix Hoenikker in the novel Cat's Cradle, and the character's invention of ice-nine, a new phase of water ice (similar in name only to Ice IX). Langmuir had worked with Vonnegut's brother, Bernard Vonnegut at General Electric on seeding ice crystals to diminish or increase rain or storms.

== Honors ==
- Fellow of the American Academy of Arts and Sciences (1918)
- Member of the United States National Academy of Sciences (1918)
- Member of the American Philosophical Society (1922)
- Perkin Medal (1928)
- Nobel Prize in Chemistry (1932)
- Franklin Medal (1934)
- Faraday Medal (1944)
- John J. Carty Award of the National Academy of Sciences (1950)
- Mount Langmuir (elevation 8022 ft / 2445m) in Copper River, Chugach National Forest, Alaska, is named after him
- Langmuir College, a residential college at Stony Brook University in H-Quad, named for him in 1970
- The New Mexico Institute of Mining and Technology operates the Langmuir Laboratory for Atmospheric Research named in his honor

== Patents ==
- Langmuir, U.S. patent 1,180,159, "Incandescent Electric Lamp"
- Langmuir, U.S. patent 1,244,217, "Electron-discharge apparatus and method of operating the same"
- Langmuir, U.S. patent 1,251,388, "Method of and apparatus for controlling x-ray tubes"

== See also ==
- 18-electron rule
- Irving Langmuir House
- Langmuir isotherm
- Langmuir trough
- Langmuir equation, an equation that relates the coverage or adsorption of molecules on a solid surface to gas pressure or concentration of a medium above the solid surface at a fixed temperature
- Langmuir wave, a rapid oscillation of the electron density in conducting media such as plasmas or metals
- Langmuir states, three-dimensional quantum states of Helium when both electrons move in phase on Bohr circular orbits and mutually repel
- Langmuir–Blodgett film
- Child–Langmuir law
- Langmuir–Taylor detector
- List of things named after Irving Langmuir
