= Nanochannel glass materials =

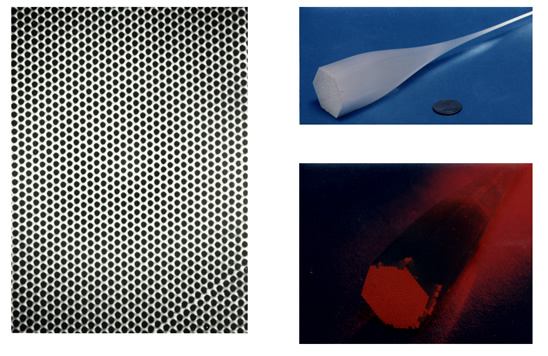
Nanochannel glass materials are complex glass structures containing large numbers of parallel hollow channels. Source: Naval Research Laboratory - Technology Transfer Office.

Nanochannel glass materials are an experimental mask technology that is an alternate method for fabricating nanostructures, although optical lithography is the predominant patterning technique.

Nanochannel glass materials are complex glass structures containing large numbers of parallel hollow channels. In its simplest form, the hollow channels are arranged in geometric arrays with packing densities as great as 10^{11} channels/cm^{2}. Channel dimensions are controllable from micrometers to tens of nanometers, while retaining excellent channel uniformity. Exact replicas of the channel glass can be made from a variety of materials. This is a low cost method for creating identical structures with nanoscale features in large numbers.

== Characteristics ==
These materials have high density of uniform channels with diameters from 15 micrometres to 15 nanometers. These are rigid structures with serviceable temperatures to at least 300 °C, with potential up to 1000 °C. Furthermore, these are optically transparent photonic structures with high degree of reproducibility.

The materials can be fabricated using methods in nanolithography such as electron beam lithography (EBL), focused ion beam (FIB), and nanoimprint lithography (NIL).

== Applications ==
These can be used as a material for chromatographic columns, unidirectional conductors, Microchannel plate and nonlinear optical devices. They are used in sensors for chemical and biological processes. Other uses are as masks for semiconductor development, including ion implantation, optical lithography, and reactive ion etching.

== See also ==
- E-beam lithography
- Ion beam lithography
- Maskless lithography
- Nanolithography
- Photolithography
- Porous glass
- Vycor glass
