= Microlithography =

Semiconductor technology

Microlithography is a general name for any manufacturing process that can create a minutely patterned thin film of protective materials over a substrate, such as a silicon wafer, in order to protect selected areas of it during subsequent etching, deposition, or implantation operations. The term is normally used for processes that can reliably produce features of microscopic size, such as 10 micrometres or less. The term nanolithography may be used to designate processes that can produce nanoscale features, such as less than 100 nanometres.

Microlithography is a microfabrication process that is extensively used in the semiconductor industry and also manufactures microelectromechanical systems.

== Processes ==
Specific microlithography processes include:

- Photolithography using light projected on a photosensitive material film (photoresist).
- Electron beam lithography, using a steerable electron beam.
- Nanoimprinting
- Interference lithography
- Magnetolithography
- Scanning probe lithography
- Surface-charge lithography
- Diffraction lithography

These processes differ in speed and cost, as well as in the material they can be applied to and the range of feature sizes they can produce. For instance, while the size of features achievable with photolithography is limited by the wavelength of the light used, the technique it is considerably faster and simpler than electron beam lithography, that can achieve much smaller ones.

== Applications ==
The main application for microlithography is fabrication of integrated circuits ("electronic chips"), such as solid-state memories and microprocessors. They can also be used to create diffraction gratings, microscope calibration grids, and other flat structures with microscopic details.

== See also ==
- Printed circuit board
