= Multibeam Corporation =

American semiconductor designing company

- Industry: Semiconductor industry
- Founded: 2010; 16 years ago
- Headquarters: Santa Clara, California
- Key people: David K. Lam (Chairman)
- Products: E-beam lithography systems for the semiconductor industry
- Website: http://www.multibeamcorp.com

Multibeam is an American corporation that engages in the design, manufacture, and sale of semiconductor processing equipment used in the fabrication of integrated circuits. Headquartered in Santa Clara, in the Silicon Valley, Multibeam is led by Dr. David K. Lam, the founder and first CEO of Lam Research. Multibeam Corporation is a member of the eBeam Initiative.

== History ==
Multibeam shipped its first MEBL platform to SkyWater Technology, in Bloomington, Minnesota, in July 2024.

== Technology ==
Multibeam developed miniature, all-electrostatic columns for e-beam lithography, that provide a maskless and high throughput platform for writing nanoscale IC patterns seamlessly across full wafers. Arrays of e-beam columns operate simultaneously and in parallel to increase wafer processing speed. With over 35 patents issued, these multi-column e-beam lithography (MEBL) systems enable an array of direct write lithography applications, including Complementary E-Beam Lithography (CEBL), Secure Chip ID, Advanced Packaging Interposers, Photonics, and other applications where precise, nanometer-scale features are required.

== Applications ==
- Complementary Electron Beam Lithography (CEBL) works with optical lithography to pattern cuts (of lines in "lines-and-cuts" layout) and holes (i.e., contacts and vias) with no masks.
- Secure Chip ID embeds unique security information in each IC including chip ID, IP or MAC address, and chip-specific information such as keys used in encryption. Chip ID is used for supply chain traceability and to detect counterfeits. Hardware-embedded encryption keys are used to authenticate software. Chip-specific information written into bit registers is non-volatile.
- Advanced Packaging Interposers can be used in chip fabrication in semiconductor chip packaging applications where high performance, low power, long battery life and compact size are needed. Patterns can be varied on a small scale over a large field with nanometer resolutions. Used in high volume or batch production of System in a Package (SiP), MEMS & Sensor Packaging, Fan Out Packaging, and 2.5D/3D IC Packaging.
- Photonics applications benefit from the flexibility of creating high precision curvilinear and varying patterns over wide fields of view for the generation, control, and channeling of light.
