= Maskless lithography =

Lithography that does not use photomasks

Maskless lithography (MPL) is a photomask-less photolithography-like technology used to project or focal-spot write the image pattern onto a chemical resist-coated substrate (e.g. wafer) by means of UV radiation or electron beam.

In microlithography, typically UV radiation casts an image of a time constant mask onto a photosensitive emulsion (or photoresist). Traditionally, mask aligners, steppers, scanners, and other kinds of non-optical techniques are used for high speed microfabrication of microstructures, but in case of MPL, some of these become redundant.

Maskless lithography has two approaches to project a pattern: rasterized and vectorized. In the first one it utilizes generation of a time-variant intermittent image on an electronically modifiable (virtual) mask that is projected with known means (also known as laser direct imaging and other synonyms). In the vectored approach, direct writing is achieved by radiation that is focused to a narrow beam that is scanned in vector form across the resist. The beam is then used to directly write the image into the photoresist, one or more pixels at a time. Also combinations of the two approaches are known, and it is not limited to optical radiation, but also extends into the UV, includes electron-beams and also mechanical or thermal ablation via MEMS devices.

Maskless lithography's advantages have included "resolution and flexibility." However, low through-put and integration difficulties delayed high-volume adoption.

== Forms ==
Currently, the main forms of maskless lithography are electron beam and optical. In addition, focused ion beam (FIB) systems have established an important niche role in failure analysis and defect repair. Also, systems based on arrays of mechanical and thermally ablative probe tips have been demonstrated.

=== Electron beam (e-beam) ===
The most commonly used form of maskless lithography today is electron beam lithography. Its widespread use is due to the wide range of electron beam systems available accessing an equally wide range of electron beam energies (~10 eV to ~100 keV). This is already being used in wafer-level production at eASIC, which uses conventional direct-write electron beam lithography to customize a single via layer for low-cost production of ASICs.

Most maskless lithography systems currently being developed are based on the use of multiple electron beams. The goal is to use the parallel scanning of the beams to speed up the patterning of large areas. However, a fundamental consideration here is to what degree electrons from neighboring beams can disturb one another (from Coulomb repulsion). Since the electrons in parallel beams are traveling equally fast, they will persistently repel one another, while the electron lenses act over only a portion of the electrons' trajectories.

=== Optical ===
Direct laser writing is a very popular form of optical maskless lithography, which offers flexibility, ease of use, and cost effectiveness in R&D processing (small batch production). The underlying technology uses spatial light modulating (SLM) micro-arrays based on glass to block laser pathway from reaching a substrate with a photoresist (in similar manner to digital micromirror devices). This equipment offers rapid patterning at sub-micrometer resolutions, and offers a compromise between performance and cost when working with feature sizes of approximately 200 nm or greater. Direct laser writing for microelectronics packaging, 3D electronics and heterogeneous integration were developed in 1995 at the Microelectronics and Computer Technology Corporation (or MCC) in Austin, Texas. The MCC system was fully integrated with precision control for 3D surfaces and artificial intelligence software with real-time machine learning and included laser wavelengths for standard i-line resist and DUV 248nm. The MCC system also included circuit editing capabilities for isolating circuits on a programmable wafer design. In 1999, the MCC system was advanced for use in MEMS manufacturing.

Interference lithography or holographic exposures are not maskless processes and therefore do not count as "maskless", although they have no 1:1 imaging system in between.

Plasmonic direct writing lithography uses localized surface plasmon excitations via scanning probes to directly expose the photoresist.

For improved image resolution, ultraviolet light, which has a shorter wavelength than visible light, is used to achieve resolution down to around 100 nm. The main optical maskless lithography systems in use today are the ones developed for generating photomasks for the semiconductor and LCD industries.

In 2013, a group at Swinburne University of Technology published their achievement of 9 nm feature size and 52 nm pitch, using a combination of two optical beams of different wavelengths.

DLP technology can also be used for maskless lithography.

=== Focused ion beam ===
Focused ion beam systems are commonly used today for sputtering away defects or uncovering buried features. The use of ion sputtering must take into account the redeposition of sputtered material.

=== Proton beam writing ===
Proton beam writing (or p-beam writing) is a direct-write lithography process that uses a focused beam of high energy (MeV) protons to pattern resist material at nanodimensions. The process, although similar in many ways to direct writing using electrons, nevertheless offers some interesting and unique advantages.

=== Probe-tip contact ===
IBM Research has developed an alternative maskless lithography technique based on atomic force microscopy. In addition, Dip Pen Nanolithography is a promising new approach for patterning submicrometer features.

== Research ==
=== 2000s ===
Technologies that enable maskless lithography is already used for the production of photomasks and in limited wafer-level production. There are some obstacles ahead of its use in high-volume manufacturing. First, there is a wide diversity of maskless techniques. Even within the electron-beam category, there are several vendors (Multibeam, Mapper Lithography, Canon, Advantest, Nuflare, JEOL) with entirely different architectures and beam energies. Second, throughput targets exceeding 10 wafers per hour still need to be met. Third, the capacity and ability to handle the large data volume (Tb-scale) needs to be developed and demonstrated.

In recent years DARPA and NIST have reduced support for maskless lithography in the U.S.

There was a European program that would push the insertion of maskless lithography for IC manufacturing at the 32-nm half-pitch node in 2009. Project name was MAGIC, or "MAskless lithoGraphy for IC manufacturing", in frame of EC 7th Framework Programme (FP7).

Due to the increased mask costs for multiple patterning, maskless lithography is once again prompts relevant research in this field.

=== DARPA (United States) ===
Since at least 2001 DARPA has invested in a variety of maskless patterning technologies including parallel e-beam arrays, parallel scanning probe arrays, and an innovative e-beam lithography tool to enable low-volume manufacturing process. The technology is codenamed as Gratings of Regular Arrays and Trim Exposures (GRATE) (previously known as Cost Effective Low Volume Nanofabrication).

== Economics ==
=== Foundries ===
In 2018 the Dutch and Russia jointly funded (Rusnano) company Mapper Lithography producing multi e-beam maskless lithography MEMS components went bankrupt and was acquired by ASML Holding, a major competitor at the time. The foundry producing devices is located near Moscow, Russia. As of early 2019 it was run by Mapper LLC. The Mapper Lithography originally was created at Delft University of Technology in 2000.
