= David Lam (disambiguation) =

David Lam (1923–2010) was the 25th Lieutenant Governor of British Columbia, Canada.

David Lam may also refer to:

- David K. Lam (born 1943), American tech entrepreneur
- David Lam (film director), Hong Kong film director
- David Lam (doctor), Surgeon based in Hong Kong and member of the Hong Kong Legislative Council for Medical and Health Services
