= Pui Ching Middle Schools =

Baptist School chain in Guangzhou, China

Information
- Motto: 至善至正
- Established: 1889
- Grades: Kindergarten, Primary school, Secondary school
- Website: www.puiching.edu.mo/en/main/

Pui Ching Middle Schools
- Traditional Chinese: 培正中學
- Simplified Chinese: 培正中学
Transcriptions
Standard Mandarin
- Hanyu Pinyin: Péizhèng Zhōngxué
Yue: Cantonese
- Jyutping: pui4 zing3 zung1 hok6

The Pui Ching Middle Schools (Chinese: 培正中學) is a system of Baptist secondary schools first founded in Guangzhou, Guangdong Province, China and later Hong Kong and Macau. Located at Peizheng Road in Yuexiu District, Guangzhou Pui Ching Middle School is a state-owned full-time public school with its campus covering an area of nearly 70,000 square meters. The school has 36 classes for senior grade and 26 classes for the junior grade. There are 230 teachers, among whom 66 people are senior teachers.

== History ==
The original Guangzhou school was founded in 1889 by local Chinese Baptists, and was the first Christian school in China founded by local Christians rather than foreign missionaries. The Guangzhou school was disbanded and students moved to Macau in January 1938 due to the spread of World War II to Southern China. The Guangzhou school was subsequently reopened after the war.

== School song ==
The lyrics of the school song come from a poem, written by Li Zhu-hou, a Chinese language teacher at Pui Ching Middle School. The song was arranged by Ho An-tung, with its melody identical to Wien Neêrlands Bloed, the former national anthem of the Netherlands.

== Macau School ==
The Guangzhou school was moved to Macau in 1938. It is now an integrated grammar school with more than 3,000 students in its kindergarten, primary school, junior high and senior high sections.

== Guangzhou School ==
- Pui Ching Middle School (Guangzhou)

== Notable alumni ==
- David K. Lam, Founder and Former CEO of Lam Research Corporation
