= Abhi =

Abhi may refer to:

- Abhi (2003 film), 2003 Indian Kannada film starring Puneeth Rajkumar
- Abhi (2024 film), 2024 Pakistani film starring Kubra Khan
- Abhi the Nomad (born 1993), Indian rapper and singer
- Abhi Bhattacharya, Indian actor
- Abhi Talwalkar, Indian businessman
