= Confined water =

Confined water may refer to:

- Confined liquid, a liquid subject to geometric constraints on a nanoscopic scale
- Confined water (diving), a diving environment that is enclosed and bounded sufficiently for safe training purposes
- Confined waters (navigation), an area of the sea where the width of the safely navigable waterway is small relative to the ability of a vessel to maneuver
