= Space Nanotechnology Laboratory =

The Space Nanotechnology Laboratory performs research in interference lithography and diffraction grating fabrication. It has fabricated the high energy transmission gratings for one of NASA's Great Observatories, the Chandra X-Ray Observatory. It is also the home of the Nanoruler, a unique and high-precision grating patterning tool.
