= Nanoruler =

Tool to make accurate measurements in nanoscale

A nanoruler is a tool or a method used within the subfield of "nanometrology" to achieve precise control and measurements at the nanoscale (i.e. nanometer, a billion times smaller than a meter). Measurements of extremely tiny proportions require more complicated procedures, such as manipulating the properties of light (plasmonic) or DNA to determine distances. At the nanoscale, materials and devices exhibit unique properties that can significantly influence their behavior. In fields like electronics, medicine, and biotechnology, where advancements come from manipulating matter at the atomic and molecular levels, nanoscale measurements become essential.

The nanoruler is also a tool developed by the Massachusetts Institute of Technology with extreme precision, achieved through the technique of scanning beam interference lithography (SBIL). The director of the project, Mark L. Schattenburg, began it with the intention of helping the semiconductor industry, which is required in devices such as computer chips that have components nanometers in size, hence the importance of having a tool capable of nanoscale precision. The Nanoruler was developed in the Space Nanotechnology Laboratory of the Kavli Institute for Astrophysics and Space Research at the Massachusetts Institute of Technology.

== Types of Nanoruler ==
=== Plasmonic Nanoruler ===
==== Localized Surface Plasmon Resonance ====
Surface plasmon resonance (SPR) is a phenomenon where free electrons in metals oscillate when illuminated by light at a specific wavelength(color) at a particular angle. This oscillation is similar to the ripples created when a rock is thrown into a pond. Localized surface plasmon resonance (LSPR) refers to a concentrated region of SPR found on metallic nanoparticles, or metals at the nanoscale, enabling more precise analysis. Each nanoparticle will have its unique LSPR depending on the particle's size and geometry. When multiple nanoparticles are brought together within nanometer distances, their LSPRs interact, leading to optical changes. LSPRs are highly sensitive and can be influenced by various factors, including plasmonic coupling, the surrounding dielectric medium, or distances. Scientists observe these effects and analyze the data, typically in the form of refractive index and shifts in wavelength, to determine measurements.

==== Fano resonances ====
Some nanorulers utilize Fano resonances, which are asymmetric line curves resulting from the interference of multiple electromagnetic waves. These resonances are typically observed at specific distances of separation, such as those between gold (Au) nanostructures. Analogous to LSPRs, Fano resonances are used for measurement because of their strong sensitivity to change, such as distances. This allows for precise measurements in very tiny separations for analysis. In certain applications, second harmonic generation (SHG), a nonlinear optical process where two photons of the same frequency combine to generate a single photon at twice the frequency, is utilized in support with Fano resonances for nonlinear measurements. Certain nanostructures (e.g. a gold nanodolmen using three gold nanorods) can exhibit strong SHG responses and lead to specific emission patterns. This method has been used to accurately determine complex 3-dimensional macromolecular entities.

=== DNA Origami Nanoruler ===
In 2006, Paul Rothemund made a breakthrough in DNA nanotechnology, developing the DNA origami. His DNA origami took a long, single-stranded DNA molecule (referred to as the "scaffold") and folded it into short, single-stranded DNA oligonucleotides (referred to as "staples"). This revolution allowed for the creation of nanostructures with highly controlled dimensions by designing the DNA scaffold strand and selecting the appropriate staple strands that can serve as nanorulers by itself. DNA origami structures can be designed with specific attachment sites for other nanoscale components, such as nanoparticles, fluorophores, or proteins. By measuring the distances between these components on the origami structures, researchers can perform precise distance measurements at the nanoscale through atomic force microscopy (AFM) and the use of RNA. In the design process, DNA origami structures are equipped with predetermined binding sites for RNA molecules, strategically positioned to facilitate hybridization. Upon introducing RNA molecules, these hybridization events are measured using AFM, providing both visualization and precise nanoscale measurements.

=== MIT's Nanoruler ===
In 2004, MIT developed the Nanoruler, a machine that was more precise and faster at grating than any other methods at the time. To achieve this, MIT combined two conventional methods of grating, mechanical ruling and interference lithography, into a new technique: scanning beam interference lithography (SBIL). In "traditional" interference lithography, two beams of light interfere with each other producing fringes, similar to how two ripples in the water will create a standing wave where the two ripples meet. The standing wave is the fringe, which gets recorded onto a photoresist on top of a substrate, eventually becoming grating lines. The difference between the "traditional" interference lithography method and the SBIL method is the final gratings they produce. Interference lithography struggles to produce linear gratings and the end results are often nonlinear. It's not ideal, since gratings should be linear and uniform. With SBIL, the approach is similar to that of interference lithography but utilizes two, narrow UV laser beams that interfere and create fringes. The narrowness creates smaller distortions, thereby more linear fringes than interference lithography. The substrate is also attached to a stage, enabling the photoresist to move in a "scanning" motion. This motion creates the grating pattern with near 1 nm precision across a 300 nm substrate in around 20 minutes.

== Applications ==
Nanorulers allow scientists to investigate the fundamental building blocks of matter, including atoms and molecules.

Life sciences have particularly benefited from nanotechnology. Nanoscale measurements are used for characterizing nanoparticles for drug delivery, studying biological molecules, and exploring cell structures at the nanoscale. Additionally, SPR has been well-established and widely used for biosensing.

In MIT's case, they developed the Nanoruler machine in order to manufacture semiconductors with higher precision and at faster speeds. Reducing size is important in this industry because the smaller a semiconductor is, the more semiconductors can be placed within a device such as a microchip, which makes the microchip more powerful.
