= Confinement =

Confinement may refer to:

- With respect to humans:
  - An old-fashioned or archaic synonym for childbirth
  - Postpartum confinement (or postnatal confinement), a system of recovery after childbirth, involving rest and special foods
  - Civil confinement for psychiatric patients
  - Imprisonment, usually as punishment for committing a crime
    - False imprisonment
  - Solitary confinement, a strict form of imprisonment
  - Home care supported living
- The confinement of an animal specimen in a zoo
- In physics:
  - Color confinement, the physical principle explaining the non-observation of color charged particles like free quarks
  - Confinement of thermonuclear plasmas, as a requirement to obtain fusion energy
  - Confined liquid, by pores or similar
  - Quantum confinement

Confinement may also refer to:

- Confinement (2023 film), a 2023 Singaporean horror-thriller film
- 2149: The Aftermath (also titled Confinement), a 2016 Canadian film

== See also ==
- Isolation (health care)
- Lockdown
