= Porous glass =

Glass having minuscule pores

Porous glass is glass that includes pores, usually in the nanometre- or micrometre-range, commonly prepared by one of the following processes: through metastable phase separation in borosilicate glasses (such as in their system SiO_{2}-B_{2}O_{3}-Na_{2}O), followed by liquid extraction of one of the formed phases; through the sol-gel process; or simply by sintering glass powder.

The specific properties and commercial availability of porous glass make it one of the most extensively researched and characterized amorphous solids. Due to the possibility of modeling the microstructure, porous glasses have a high potential as a model system. They show a high chemical, thermal and mechanical resistance, which results from a rigid and incompressible silica network. They can be produced in high quality and with pore sizes ranging from 1 nm up to any desired value. An easy functionalization of the inner surface opens a wide field of applications for porous glasses.

A further special advantage of porous glasses compared to other porous materials, is that they can be made not only as powder or granulate, but also as larger pieces in almost any user defined shape and texture.

== History ==
In the first half of the 20th century, Turner and Winks discovered that borosilicate glasses can be leached by acids. Their investigations showed that not only the chemical stability can be influenced by thermal treatment but also density, refractive index, thermal expansion and viscosity. In 1934, Nordberg and Hood discovered that alkali borosilicate glasses separate in soluble (sodium borate rich) and insoluble (silica rich) phases if the glass is thermally treated. By extraction using mineral acids the soluble phase can be removed and a porous silica network remains. During a sintering process after extraction, a silica glass is generated, which has properties approaching those of quartz glass. The manufacturing of such high-silica glasses has been published as the VYCOR-process.

== Definition ==
In scientific literature, porous glass is a porous material containing approximately 96% silica, which is produced by an acidic extraction or a combined acidic and alkaline extraction respectively, of phase separated alkali borosilicate glasses, and features a three-dimensional interconnected porous microstructure. For commercially available porous glasses, the terms porous VYCOR-Glass (PVG) and Controlled Pore Glass (CPG) are used. The pore structure is formed by a syndetic channel system and has a specific surface from 10 to 300 m^{2}/g. Porous glasses can be generated by an acidic extraction of phase separated alkaliborosilica glasses, or by a sol-gel-process. By regulating the manufacturing parameters, it is possible to produce a porous glass with a pore size of between 0.4 and 1000 nm in a very narrow pore size distribution. You can generate various moulds, for example, irregular particles (powder, granulate), spheres, plates, sticks, fibers, ultra thin membranes, tubes and rings.

== Manufacturing ==
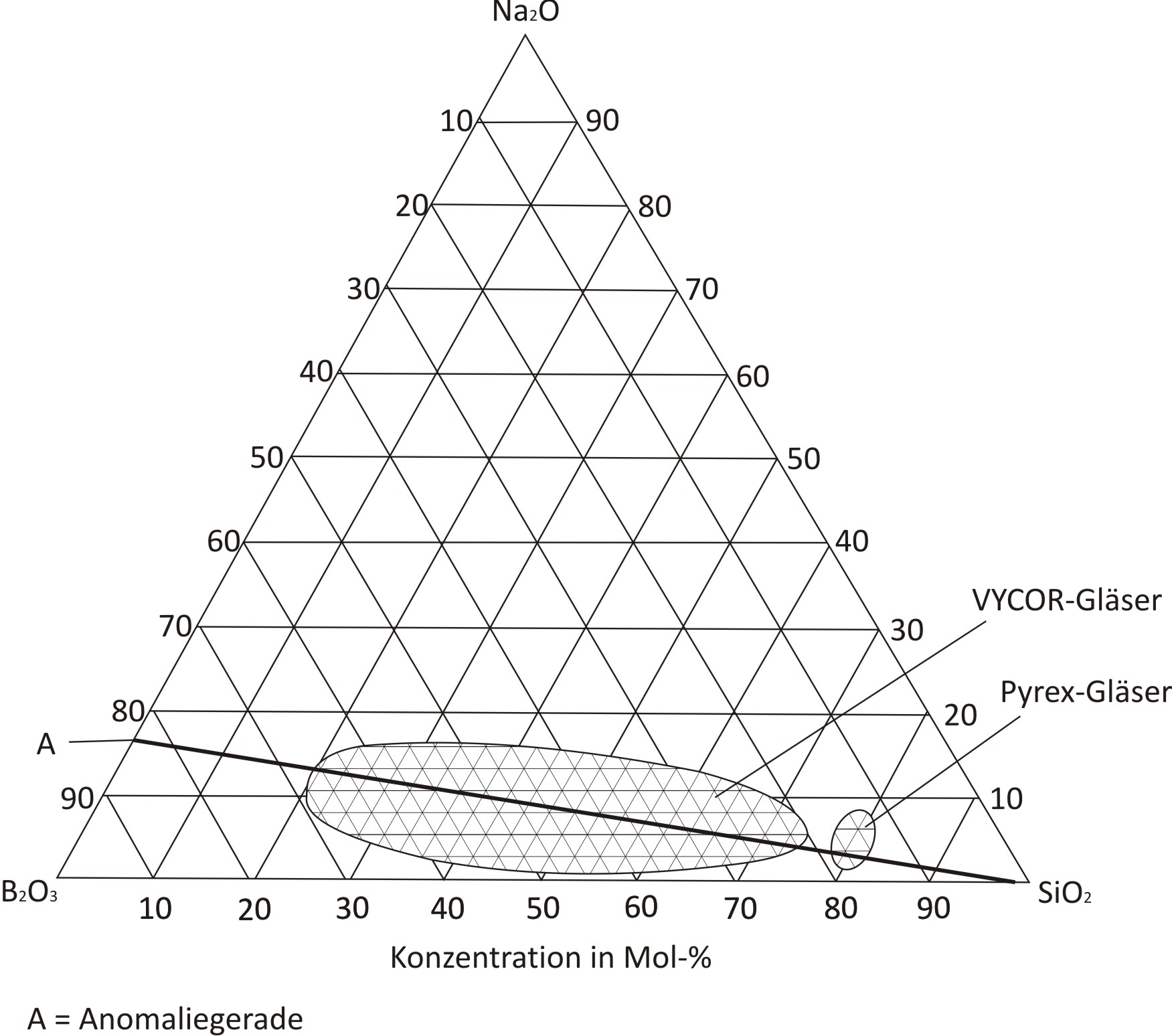
Ternary Phase diagram in the sodium borosilicate system

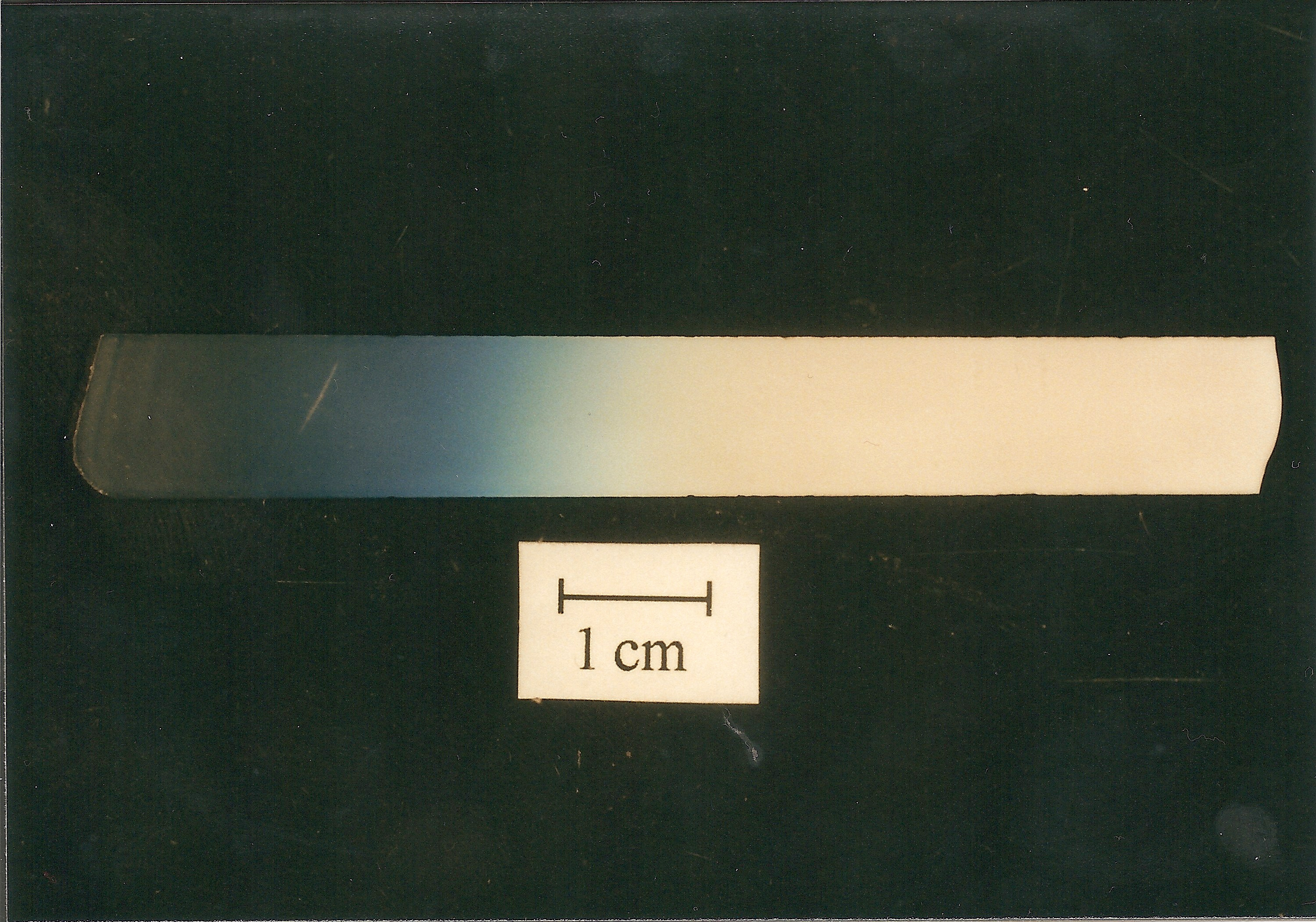
Porous glass filled with water, sample about 1 mm thick, made by phase separation in a thermal gradient (high temperature on the right) of a sodium borosilicate glass, followed by acid leaching

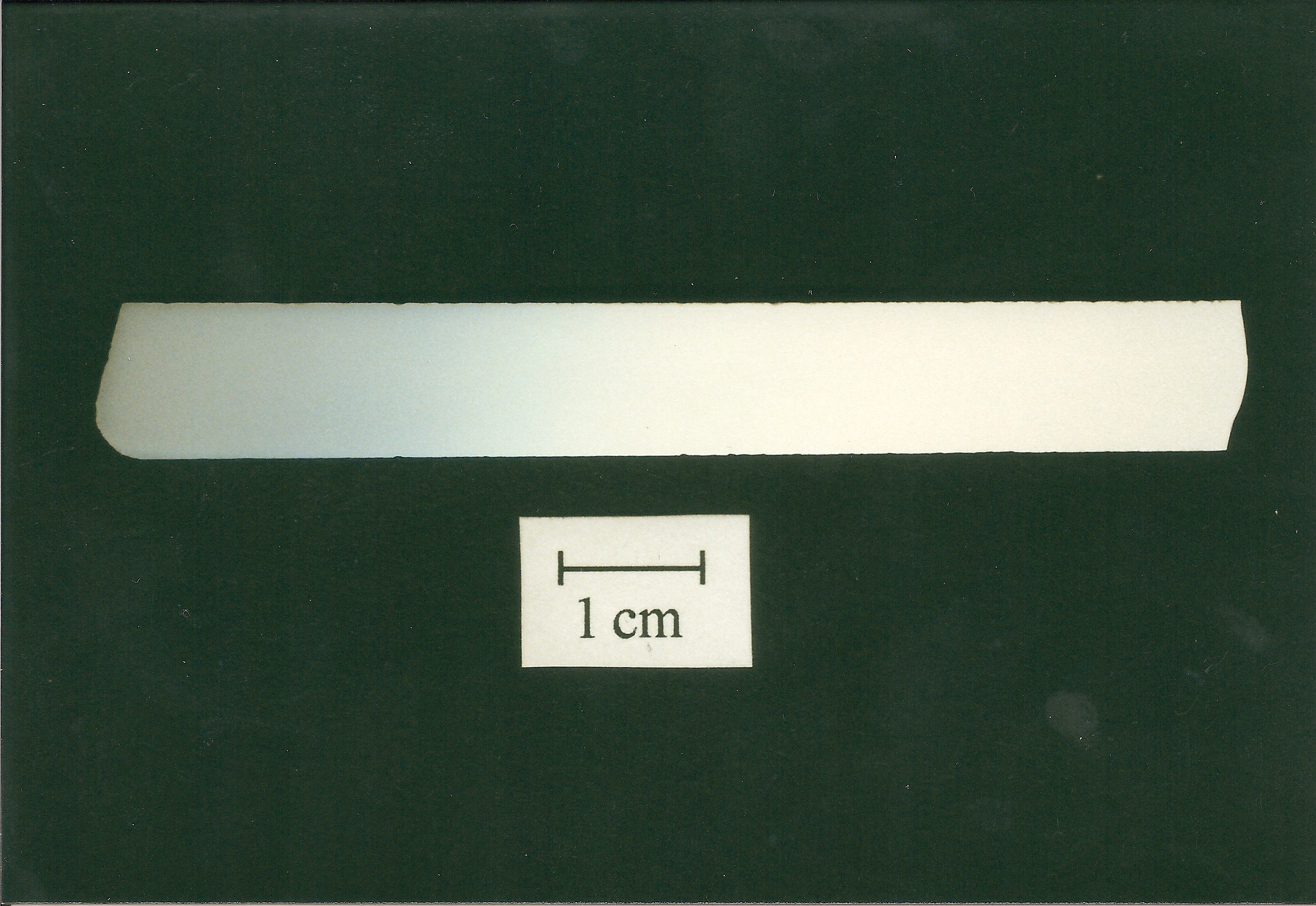
Same porous glass as above, but dry. The increased difference between the refractive indices glass/air as compared to glass/water is causing greater whiteness based on the Tyndall effect.

Precondition for repetitious manufacturing of porous glass is the knowledge about structure determining and structure controlling parameters. The composition of the initial glass is a structure controlling parameter. The manufacturing of the initial glass, mainly the cooling process, the temperature and time of thermal treatment, and the after treatment are structure determining parameters. The phase diagram for sodiumborosilica glass shows a miscibility gap for certain glass compositions.

The upper critical temperature lies at about 760 °C and the lower one at about 500 °C. O.S. Moltschanova was the first person who exactly described the definition of the exsolution. For a phase separation the initial glass composition must lie in the miscibility gap of the ternary Na_{2}O-B_{2}O_{3}-SiO_{2} glass system. By a thermal treatment, an interpenetration structure is generated, which results from a spinodal decomposition of the sodium-rich borate phase and the silica phase. This procedure is called primary decomposition. Using an initial glass composition, which lies on the line of anomaly, it is possible to attain a maximum decomposition, which is almost strainless.

As both phases have a different resistances to water, mineral acids, and inorganic salt solutions, the sodium-rich borate phase in these mediums can be removed by extraction. Optimal extraction is possible only if the initial glass composition and thermal treatment are chosen such that combine structures form, and not droplet structures. The texture is influenced by the composition of the initial glass, which directs size and type of decomposition areas. In the context of porous glasses, "texture" implies properties like specific pore volume, specific surface, pore size, and porosity. Furthermore, the texture of porous glasses is influenced by the concentration of the extraction medium and the ratio of fluid to solid. The emerging areas of decomposition depend on time and temperature of the thermal treatment.

Also, colloidal silica is solving in the sodium-rich borate phase, when time and temperature of thermal treatment are increased. This process is called secondary decomposition. The colloidal silica deposit in the macro pores during extraction and obscure the real pore structure. The solubility of colloidal silica in alkaline solutions is higher than network silica, and thus can be removed by an alkaline after-treatment.

== Applications ==
Because of their high mechanical, thermal and chemical stability, variable manufacturing of pore sizes with a small pore size distribution and variety of surface modifications, a wide array of applications are possible. The fact that porous glasses can be produced in many different shapes is another advantage for application in industry, medicine, pharmacy research, biotechnology and sensor technology.

Porous glasses are ideal for material separation, because of the small pore size distribution. This is why they are used in gas chromatography, thin layer chromatography and affinity chromatography. An adaptation of stationary phase for a separation problem is possible by a specific modification of the surface of the porous glass.

In biotechnology, porous glasses have benefits for the cleaning of DNA and the immobilization of enzymes or microorganisms. Controlled pore glass (CPG) with pore sizes between 50 and 300 nm is also excellently suited for the synthesis of oligonucleotides. In this application, a linker, a nucleoside or a non-nucleosidic compound, is first attached to the surface of CPG. The chain length of produced oligonucleotides is dependent on the pore size of CPG.

In addition, porous glasses are used for manufacturing implants, especially dental implants, for which porous glass powder is processed with plastics to form a composite. The particle size and the pore size influence the elasticity of the composite so as to fit the optical and mechanical properties to surrounding tissue, for example, the appearance and hardness of dental enamel.

With the ability to form porous glasses as platelets, membrane technology is another important area of application. Hyper filtration of sea – and brackish water and ultra filtration in "downstream process" are but two. Additionally, they are often appropriate as a carrier for catalysts. For example, the olefin – metathesis was realized on the system metal – metal oxide/porous glass.

Porous glasses can be used as membrane reactors as well, again because of their high mechanical, thermal and chemical stability. Membrane reactors can improve conversion of limited balance reactions, while one reaction product is removed by a selective membrane. For example, in the decomposition of hydrogen sulfide on a catalyst in a glass capillary, the conversion by reaction was higher with glass capillary than without.

== See also ==
- Vycor
- Nanochannel glass materials
