= PBW =

PBW may refer to:

- Philadelphia-Baltimore-Washington Stock Exchange
- Peanut Butter Wolf, American hip hop record producer
- Proton beam writing, a lithography process
- Play by Web, Play-by-post role-playing game
- Prosopography of the Byzantine World, a prosopographical database project
- Poincaré-Birkhoff-Witt theorem, a result in mathematics
