= Proton beam writing =

High-energy, direct-write nano-lithography

Proton beam writing (or p-beam writing) is a direct-write lithography process that uses a focused beam of high-energy (MeV) protons to pattern resist material at nanodimensions. The process, although similar in many ways to direct writing using electrons, nevertheless offers some interesting and unique advantages.

Protons, which are approximately 1800 times more massive than electrons, have deeper penetration in materials and travel in an almost straight path. This feature allows the fabrication of three-dimensional, high-aspect-ratio structures with vertical, smooth sidewalls, and low line-edge roughness. Calculations have also indicated that p-beam writing exhibits minimal proximity effects (unwanted exposure due to secondary electrons), since the secondary electrons induced in proton–electron collisions have low energy. A further advantage stems from the ability of protons to displace atoms while traversing material, thereby increasing localized damage especially at the end of range. P-beam writing produces resistive patterns at depth in silicon, allowing patterning of selective regions with different optical properties as well as the removal of undamaged regions via electrochemical etching.

The primary mechanisms for producing structures in resist materials is, in general, bond scissioning in positive resists such as polymethylmethacrylate (PMMA), or cross-linking in negative resists such as SU-8. In positive resists the regions damaged by protons are removed by chemical development to produce structures, whereas in negative resists the development procedures remove the undamaged resist leaving the cross-linked structures behind. In e-beam writing, the primary and secondary electrons create the scissioning or cross-linking, whereas in p-beam writing the damage is caused by short range proton-induced secondary electrons. The proton fluence required for exposure varies from 30–150 nCmm^{−2} depending on the resist material, and is around 1/80 to 1/100 that required by e-beam writing. Remark: The unit of the fluence in proton beam writing is usually given in "charge/area". It can be converted into "particles/area" by dividing "charge/area" by the charge of a proton, Q = 1,602·10^{−19}C.

P-beam writing is a new technology of great potential, and both current experimental data and theoretical predictions indicate that sub-10 nm 3D structuring is feasible. However, the lack of a user friendly commercial instrument with a small footprint is currently holding back the potentially wide range of application fields in which p-beam writing could make a substantial impact. Hopefully, this will be addressed in the near future.

== See also ==
- Electron-beam lithography
- Ion beam lithography
