= David K. Lam =

Founder of Lam Research Corporation

- Born: February 10, 1943 (age 83); Guangdong, China
- Education: University of Toronto (BASc); Massachusetts Institute of Technology (MS, DSc)
- Occupation: Chairman of Multibeam Corporation Chairman of David Lam Group
- Website: www.multibeamcorp.com www.davidlam.com

David Kitping Lam (Chinese: 林杰屏; pinyin: Lín Jiépíng; Jyutping: Lam4 Git6ping4) is an American technology entrepreneur. He founded Lam Research Corporation in 1980. He presently serves as Chairman of Multibeam Corporation (Santa Clara, CA), which manufactures complementary electron beam lithography (CEBL) systems. He also heads the David Lam Group, an investor and business advisor for high-growth technology companies.

== Early life and education ==
Born in Guangdong, China, David Kitping Lam spent his early childhood in Cholon, Ho Chi Minh City in South Vietnam, a large "Chinatown" near Saigon (renamed Ho Chi Minh City). His family, which fled from China to South Vietnam in the 1940s, eventually grew to include seven boys and one girl. As their new home in Vietnam became an increasingly dangerous place to live in the mid-1950s, Lam's parents moved David and most of his siblings to Hong Kong. Lam's interest in math and science grew during his teenage years in Hong Kong. After graduating from Pui Ching Middle School in Hong Kong, he boarded a ship that embarked on a three-week voyage to North America, where he would subsequently pursue studies in engineering and physics at the University of Toronto.

Lam received his Bachelor of Applied Science in Engineering Physics from the University of Toronto in 1967. During his undergraduate years, he performed nuclear physics research under Professor Derek Paul and co-authored a paper on electron-positron annihilation (1967).

Lam earned his M.S. degree and Sc.D. doctoral degree (Chemical Engineering) in 1970 and 1973, respectively, from the Massachusetts Institute of Technology. During his post-graduate years, he was a co-inventor of a plasma-produced solid lubricant that was patented under the title, "Fluorine Plasma Synthesis for Carbon Monofluoride." His doctoral research included a paper titled, "A Mechanisms and Kinetics Study of Polymeric Thin-film Deposition in Glow Discharge" that was published later in the Journal of Macromolecular Science – Chemistry (1976).

== Career ==
After graduating from MIT, Lam worked on plasma etching research and engineering at Texas Instruments and Hewlett-Packard. Although plasma etching was widely used in R&D during the 1970s, it had yet to prove practical in a production environment. Lam discovered the cause of etch variability was part technical and part human. The analog-controlled process lacked the precision required by the complex chemistry of plasma etching. Moreover, well-intentioned operators without authority often changed process settings that affected etch results. Lam envisioned a new type of production-grade plasma etcher that enabled:

- Digital control of process parameters to enhance accuracy and repeatability
- Etching one wafer at a time in a small, load-locked environment to minimize ambient contamination and process variation
- Total system automation to improve reproducibility and reduce human error

With seed capital provided by his widowed mother, he founded Lam Research Corporation in 1980, and demonstrated a fully automated working etcher about a year later. Under his guidance, the early stage venture gained a foothold in Japan and endured a double-dip recession. In 1984, Lam became the first Asian American to see the company he founded go public on the NASDAQ exchange.

After leaving Lam Research as a full-time employee in 1985, Lam served on the eponymous company's board for five consecutive years. During this period and ensuing years he worked at other companies. He engineered the turnaround of Link Technologies, a computer-terminal company that was sold to Wyse Technology in 1987. He also led software development and marketing at ExpertEdge, and later formed the David Lam Group in 1995 to provide management advice and investment capital to early stage ventures as well as established companies in transition.

Lam has mentored entrepreneurs across a number of fields including micro- and nano-electronic device manufacturing, computer hardware and software, medical devices, and energy infrastructure businesses.

Lam presently serves as Chairman of Multibeam Corporation, which pioneered the development of CEBL (complementary electron beam lithography) and DEW (direct electron writing) systems. As conventional optical lithography reaches its limits, the required photomasks become very expensive. CEBL systems can be incorporated into existing optical lines to reduce the number of expensive photomasks required for certain critical layers.

Lam provides guidance to emerging technology enterprises through the David Lam Group. He has served on Boards of Directors and advised management at various stages of growth at companies including Microprobe (acquired by FormFactor in 2012), Xradia (acquired by ZEISS in 2013), and SSEC (acquired by Veeco in 2014) in semiconductor and semiconductor equipment, micro- and nano-device manufacturing, computer hardware and software, medical devices, and energy infrastructure.

== Pro bono work ==
Lam has done volunteer work for several governmental, community, and educational organizations.

- Appointed by President George H. W. Bush to serve on the U.S. Commission on Minority Business Development (1989–91)
- One of twenty business executives in the Presidential Business Development Mission to China led by the late Ron Brown, Secretary of Commerce under President Bill Clinton (1994)
- Appointed by California Chief Justice Malcolm M. Lucas to serve on the Commission on the Future of the Courts (1991–93)
- Involved in the 1990 founding of the Committee of 100, a lobby group of Chinese Americans, and served for six years from its inception as a vice chair and for eight years as a director.
- Led the Asia America Multitechnology Association from being a small Asian technology association into becoming a multinational network of technology entrepreneurs and professionals
- Called upon by Joint Venture Silicon Valley, a public-private collaboration to spur economic growth and job creation in California, to lead the technology export initiative (1990–93)
- Active on the Board of Governors of the National Conference for Christians and Jews (NCCJ), renamed later the National Conference for Community and Justice (1995-2004)
- On the Massachusetts Institute of Technology's Visiting Committee for the Department of Chemical Engineering. This outside group appointed by MIT offers appraisal, advice, and insight on academic and other major programs of the Department (1988–96).
- As advisor to Dr. Robert Caret, president of San Jose State University (1995-2000), provided guidance to strengthen SJSU's financial posture and encouraged working with the City of San Jose, California to form a joint library, the nation's first such collaboration. The Dr. Martin Luther King Jr. Library, which opened in 2003, has since won several national awards, including 2004 Library of the Year from Thomson Gale/Library Journal.

== Honors ==
- 2013: Inducted into the Silicon Valley Engineering Hall of Fame
- 2011: Under Lam's leadership, Multibeam Corporation was twice honored by Red Herring as a Top 100 company in both North America and Global listings.
- 1999: The Contra Costa Times described Lam as one of the "Century’s Top Movers and Shapers" during the 1981 to 2000 period. As an "anchor tenant" of the emerging technology hub in Fremont, Lam Research was praised for the role it played in helping the East Bay city attract other high-tech manufacturers
- 1997: The Tech Museum of Innovation in Silicon Valley honored Lam in "The Revolutionaries" series of articles, featuring him in the March 23rd edition of the San Jose Mercury News
