= Ion beam lithography =

Lithographic technique that uses a scanning ion beam

Ion-beam lithography is the practice of scanning a focused beam of ions in a patterned fashion across a surface in order to create very small structures such as integrated circuits or other nanostructures.

== Details ==
Ion-beam lithography has been found to be useful for transferring high-fidelity patterns on three-dimensional surfaces.

Ion-beam lithography offers higher resolution patterning than UV, X-ray, and electron beam lithography because these heavier particles have more momentum. This gives the ion beam a smaller wavelength than even an e-beam and therefore almost no diffraction. The momentum also reduces scattering in the target and in any residual gas. There is also a reduced potential radiation effect to sensitive underlying structures compared to x-ray and e-beam lithography.

Ion-beam lithography, or ion-projection lithography, is similar to Electron beam lithography, but uses much heavier charged particles, ions. In addition to diffraction being negligible, ions move in straighter paths than electrons do both through vacuum and through matter, so there seems be a potential for very high resolution. Secondary particles (electrons and atoms) have very short range, because of the lower speed of the ions. On the other hand, intense sources are more difficult to make and higher acceleration voltages are needed for a given range. Due to the higher energy loss rate, higher particle energy for a given range and the absence of significant space charge effects, shot noise will tend to be greater.

Fast-moving ions interact differently with matter than electrons do, and, owing to their higher momentum, their optical properties are different. They have much shorter range in matter and move straighter through it. At low energies, at the end of the range, they lose more of their energy to the atomic nuclei, rather than to the atoms, so that atoms are dislocated rather than ionized. If the ions don't diffuse out of the resist, they dope it. The energy loss in matter follows a Bragg curve and has a smaller statistical spread. They are "stiffer" optically, they require larger fields or distances to focus or bend. The higher momentum resists space charge effects.

Collider particle accelerators have shown that it is possible to focus and steer high momentum charged particles with very great precision.

== See also ==
- E-beam lithography
- Maskless lithography
- Nanochannel glass materials
- Photolithography
