= Alvéole Lab =

French company based in Paris and founded in 2010

- Company type: Private
- Industry: Biotechnology
- Founded: 2010
- Founders: Quattrocento, Vincent Studer, Maxime Dahan and Jean-Christophe Galas
- Headquarters: Paris, France
- Products: Photopatterning device and complementary products
- Number of employees: 12
- Website: https://www.alveolelab.com/

Alvéole is a French company based in Paris and founded in 2010 by Quattrocento, a business accelerator company in the life science field, in collaboration with researchers from the French National Center for Scientific Research with expertise in bioengineering and cell imaging.

Alvéole is specialized in the development of devices for controlling microenvironment in vitro. Its first product is Primo, a contactless and maskless photopatterning device allowing researchers to control the topography (via microfabrication) and biochemistry (via micropatterning) of cell microenvironment.

== Products ==
Alvéole's first product is Primo, a photopatterning device which can be docked on standard inverted microscopes. Primo photopatterning technique is based on LIMAP technology and combines a maskless and contactless photolithography system controlled by a dedicated software (Leonardo) and a specific photo-initiator. This system modulate UV-light illumination through an array of micromirrors (digital micromirror device). The UV light is then projected through the objective of the microscope onto the substrate in order to either perform microfabrication or protein micropatterning.

- Microfabrication: The modulated UV light is projected on a photosensitive resist. The cured photoresist can then be used as a mold to deposit PDMS and generate microstructured PDMS chips.

- Protein micropatterning: The modulated UV light is projected onto a standard cell culture substrate previously coated with an anti-fouling polymer and reacts with the photo-initiator to locally degrade this coating. Adhesion proteins can then be adsorbed on the illuminated area only, allowing for the creation of proteins micropatterns on which cells can adhere.

== Applications ==
By micropatterning adhesions proteins with a sub-cellular resolution, Primo enables to control cell adhesion and isolate single cells under highly reproducible conditions. This allows cell biology researchers from various fields – such as mechanobiology, toxicology, immunology, oncology or neurosciences – to control or study intracellular mechanisms or screen the effect of molecules on cell functions.

On a larger scale, Primo also makes it possible to control complex cellular arrangements, to study cell migration, axon guidance.

Furthermore, the micropatterning process with Primo can be performed on microstructures' sides, top or bottom, making it possible to confine single cells or multicellular arrangements in three-dimension.

One last known possible application is the photopolymerization of photo-sensitive materials, such as resins for microfabrication or photosensitive hydrogel to include rheological cues in cell microenvironment or to create permeable membranes in microfluidic channels.
