= Single layer etching =

Chemical processing technique

- Process type: Material removal process
- Inventor: Various researchers

Single layer etching is a chemical processing technique that removes material one atomic or molecular layer at a time. Manufacturers apply the technique in semiconductor fabrication for precise control over device features as sizes shrink below 10 nm. Atomic layer etching (ALE) targets individual atomic layers. Molecular layer etching (MLE) focuses on molecular layers, often in organic or hybrid inorganic-organic films. These self-limiting methods provide nanoscale precision and smooth surfaces.

Single layer etching removes material one layer at a time at the atomic or molecular scale. Manufacturers use the technique in semiconductor fabrication for precise control over device features. Atomic layer etching (ALE) targets atomic layers. Molecular layer etching (MLE) focuses on molecular layers, often in organic or hybrid films.

== Process ==
ALE employs sequential, self-limiting reactions. The cycle consists of surface modification followed by removal. Modification exposes the surface to chemicals or plasma that react with the top atomic layer to form a reactive species. Removal uses low-energy ions or other agents to desorb the modified layer. The process repeats, with etch depth determined by cycle count. For silicon, chlorine gas or plasma chlorinates the surface to form a silicon chloride layer roughly 0.5 nm thick. Argon ions at ~50 eV then sputter the modified layer. Plasma assistance accelerates reactions and supports low-temperature processing. Etch depth per cycle typically reaches 0.7 nm, maintaining smooth, uniform surfaces.

Self-limitation arises from saturation: modification halts after covering the top layer, and removal affects only the modified portion. Synergy between steps prevents etching during isolated exposures. Directional ALE uses ions for anisotropic control in high-aspect-ratio features. Isotropic ALE etches uniformly in all directions.

MLE adapts the approach to molecular layers in films grown by molecular layer deposition (MLD), such as alucone (an aluminum-based metalcone, i.e., a hybrid organic-inorganic thin film material). Sequential exposures to lithium organic salt and trimethylaluminum etch these hybrid materials. The lithium salt cleaves aluminum-oxygen bonds, and trimethylaluminum methylates the surface to yield volatile products. Etch rates show temperature dependence: ~0.4 nm per cycle at 160 °C and ~3.6 nm per cycle at 266 °C.

== History ==
Researchers explored ALE concepts starting in the late 1980s. Work in 1988 addressed diamond etching. In 1989, studies demonstrated bilayer etching of gallium arsenide. The 1990s focused on directional ALE for silicon and III-V compounds as alternatives to reactive ion etching, e.g., using carbon tetrafluoride. The 2000s shifted emphasis to oxides and group III-V materials. Interest surged around 2010 to meet sub-10 nm device requirements. Lam Research demonstrated plasma-assisted silicon ALE on commercial reactors in 2013. Fabrication plant evaluations began in 2014. Sematech initiated ALE workshops that year.

MLE developed later. Studies on etching metalcone films appeared around 2020. Related patents for molecular layer etching emerged thereafter.

== Applications ==
Single layer etching supports semiconductor manufacturing where atomic precision is required. ALE shapes features in 3D logic devices. It removes material in high-aspect-ratio structures with minimal damage. Silicon dioxide etches selectively over silicon nitride using fluorocarbon-based approaches. Group III-V materials such as gallium arsenide and indium phosphide preserve stoichiometry through chlorination or oxidation followed by removal. Metals including copper undergo chlorination and hydrogen plasma removal. Two-dimensional materials such as graphene use oxygen plasma and neutral beams. The technique aids interconnects and emerging materials at sub-10 nm nodes.

MLE controls geometries in nanoscale devices coated by MLD. It enables precise patterning of hybrid thin films for microscopic architectures.

== Research ==
ALE reverses atomic layer deposition principles using thermal or plasma-enhanced reactions. Plasma generates radicals and enables directional etching. Etch amounts per cycle reach angstrom scales. Thermal dry etching of cobalt uses sequential chlorine and diketone exposures.

MLE research emphasizes self-limiting, halogen-free processes. Quartz crystal microbalance and infrared spectroscopy verify mechanisms.

ALE processes have been documented on more than 60 materials across over 200 studies.

== See also ==
- Atomic layer etching
