= Magnetolithography =

Photolithographic technique

Magnetolithography (ML) is a photoresist-less and photomaskless lithography method for patterning wafer surfaces. ML is based on applying a magnetic field on the substrate using paramagnetic metal masks named "magnetic masks" placed on either topside or backside of the wafer. Magnetic masks are analogous to a photomask in photolithography, in that they define the spatial distribution and shape of the applied magnetic field. The fabrication of the magnetic masks involves the use of conventional photolithography and photoresist however. The second component of the process is ferromagnetic nanoparticles (analogous to the photoresist in photolithography, e.g. cobalt nanoparticles) that are assembled over the substrate according to the field induced by the mask which blocks its areas from reach of etchants or depositing materials (e.g. dopants or metallic layers).

ML can be used for applying either a positive or negative approach. In the positive approach, the magnetic nanoparticles react chemically or interact via chemical recognition with the substrate. Hence, the magnetic nanoparticles are immobilized at selected locations, where the mask induces a magnetic field, resulting in a patterned substrate. In the negative approach, the magnetic nanoparticles are inert to the substrate. Hence, once they pattern the substrate, they block their binding site on the substrate from reacting with another reacting agent. After the adsorption of the reacting agent, the nanoparticles are removed, resulting in a negatively patterned substrate.

ML is also a backside lithography, which has the advantage of ease in producing multilayer with high accuracy of alignment and with the same efficiency for all layers.
