= Vycor =

Trademark for a type of glass

Vycor is the brand name of Corning's high-silica, high-temperature glass. It provides very high thermal shock resistance. Vycor is approximately 96% silica and 4% boron trioxide, but unlike pure fused silica, it can be readily manufactured in a variety of shapes. Vycor can be subjected to prolonged usage at 900 °C.

Vycor products are made by a multi-step process. First, a relatively soft alkali-borosilicate glass is melted and formed by typical glassworking techniques into the desired shape. This is heat-treated, which causes the material to separate into two intermingled "phases" with distinct chemical compositions. One phase is rich in alkali and boric oxide and can be easily dissolved in acid. The other phase is mostly silica, which is insoluble. The glass object is then soaked in a hot acid solution, which leaches away the soluble glass phase, leaving an object which is mostly silica. At this stage, the glass is porous. Finally, the object is heated to more than 1200 °C, which consolidates the porous structure, making the object shrink slightly and become non-porous. The finished material is classified as a "reconstructed glass".

For some applications the final step is skipped, leaving the glass porous. Such glass has a high affinity for water and makes an excellent getter for water vapour. It is widely used in science and engineering.

Vycor has an extremely low coefficient of thermal expansion, just one quarter that of Pyrex. This property makes the material suitable for use in applications that demand very high dimensional stability, such as metrology instruments, and for products that need to withstand high thermal-shock loads. Vycor also has ultraviolet transmission to about 250 nm and is used in some germicidal lamps. Based on a reference thickness of 1mm, Vycor glass has an approximately 90% transmission spectra from ~300 nm to 3100 nm.

Immersing the porous glass in certain chemical solutions before the final consolidation step produces a colored glass that can withstand high temperatures without degrading. This is used for colored glass filters for various applications.

Corning manufactures Vycor products for high-temperature applications, such as evaporating dishes.

Porous vycor is a prototypical matrix material for the study of confined liquid physics.

Vycor can also be used for removal of ^{231}Pa and ^{233}Pa in fuel recycling.
