= Abhi Talwalkar =

Businessman

- Born: Abhijit Y. Talwalkar; March 10, 1964 (age 62); Pune, India
- Education: Oregon State University (BE)
- Occupation: Chairman of Lam Research
- Known for: President and CEO of LSI Corporation

Abhijit Y. Talwalkar (born March 10, 1964) is an Indian-American business executive who was president and CEO of LSI Corporation, a company that designed chips and software for datacenters and other applications.

== Early life and education ==
Talwalkar was born in Pune, India, on March 10, 1964. Talwalkar received his bachelor's degree in electrical engineering from Oregon State University in 1985.

== Career ==
Prior to 1993, Talwalkar held senior engineering and marketing management positions at Sequent Computer Systems (now part of IBM), Bipolar Integrated Technology and Lattice Semiconductor.

Talwalkar served in many upper management positions at Intel from 1993 to 2005. His career at Intel started as a Server Development Engineering and Program manager in 1993. He then served as vice president and general manager for the Intel Enterprise Platform and Service Division. In 1996, Talwalkar was promoted to co-manager and vice president of Intel's Digital Enterprise Group with Pat Gelsinger.

In May 2005, Talwalkar replaced Wilfred Corrigan as CEO of LSI Corporation. Under Talwalker's leadership, LSI became profitable again in his first four years. Talwalkar joined a company that was "in a strategic vacuum, participating in way too many markets and subscale in a lot of them." Talwalkar redirected the company to focus on the "data deluge," the massive growth in information flowing through datacenters and wireless networks. This included areas of IT, such as cloud computing, Big Data and social media and wireless networks. All of the product lines were completely rebuilt, with many of them being sold off to focus primarily on chips, and other products that work with data storage and communications. The company emerged centered on the secular trends in data and traffic growth, with reported top line growth of nine percent in 2012.

Talwalkar was appointed to serve on the board of directors for Lam Research Corporation on 22 February 2011.

Talwalkar appeared on the cover of Dataquest magazine in 2012, and was named one of the Most Influential Global Indians in Technology. That same year, Talwalkar was a featured speaker at the IDC Cloud Leadership Forum in June, as well as serving as a panelist at the December CEO2CEO Leadership Summit in New York.

In 2013, Talwalkar appeared on stage together with Box CEO Aaron Levie at the Accelerating Innovation Summit.

In December 2013, it was announced that Avago had acquired LSI Corporation for $6.6 billion in a cash transaction. LSI Corporation publicly stated that Talwalkar would leave the company after the close of the transaction.

Since 2019, Talwalkar is the chairman of Lam Research. He is a board member of AMD, TE Connectivity, iRhythm Technologies, and the Semiconductor Industry Association.

== Personal life ==
Talwalkar is married and has two sons.
