= Atomic layer etching =

Method that removes material, one 1-atom thick layer at a time

Atomic layer etching (ALE) is an emerging technique in semiconductor manufacture, in which a sequence alternating between self-limiting chemical modification steps which affect only the top atomic layers of the wafer, and etching steps which remove only the chemically-modified areas, allows the removal of individual atomic layers.

ALE processes fall into two broad categories:

- Plasma ALE: Typically involves the use of a chemical gas or radical (such as chlorine) to modify the surface, followed by removal with low-energy ion bombardment (such as argon ion sputtering). The use of a directional ion beam creates anisotropic etch profiles.
- Thermal ALE: Typically uses a neutral gas (such as hydrogen fluoride) to modify the surface, followed by removal using another chemical precursor (such as trimethylaluminum) to remove the modified layer via ligand exchange. The use of neutral gases for both steps yields isotropic etching.

ALE is a better-controlled process than reactive ion etching, though the issue with commercial use of it has been throughput; sophisticated gas handling is required, and removal rates of one atomic layer per second are around the state of the art.

The equivalent process for depositing material is atomic layer deposition (ALD). ALD is substantially more mature, having been used by Intel for high-κ dielectric layers since 2007 and in Finland in the fabrication of thin film electroluminescent devices since 1985.

== See also ==
- Single layer etching
