= Confined liquid =

Condensed matter physics

In condensed matter physics, a confined liquid is a liquid that is subject to geometric constraints on a nanoscopic scale so that most molecules are close enough to an interface to sense some difference from standard bulk liquid conditions. Typical examples are liquids in porous media, gels, or bound in solvation shells.

Confinement regularly prevents crystallization, which enables liquids to be supercooled below their homogeneous nucleation temperature even if this is impossible in the bulk state. This holds in particular for water, which is by far the most studied confined liquid.

Liquids under sub-millimeter confinement (e.g. in the gap between rigid walls) exhibit a nearly solid-like mechanical response and possess a surprisingly large low-frequency elastic shear modulus, which scales with the inverse cubic power of the confinement length.
