= Interference lithography =

Technique for patterning photomasks

Interference lithography (or holographic lithography) is a technique that uses coherent light (such as light from a laser) for patterning regular arrays of fine features without the use of complex optical systems or photomasks.

== Basic principle ==
The basic principle is the same as in interferometry or holography. An interference pattern between two or more coherent light waves is set up and recorded in a recording layer (photoresist). This interference pattern consists of a periodic series of fringes representing intensity minima and maxima. Upon post-exposure photolithographic processing, a photoresist pattern corresponding to the periodic intensity pattern emerges.

For 2-beam interference, the fringe-to-fringe spacing or period is given by $\frac{\lambda/2}{\sin\bigl(\tfrac{\theta}{2}\bigr)}$, where λ is the wavelength and θ is the angle between the two interfering waves. The minimum period achievable is then half the wavelength.

By using 3-beam interference, arrays with hexagonal symmetry can be generated, while with 4 beams, arrays with rectangular symmetry or 3D photonic crystals are generated. With multi wave interference (by inserting a diffuser into the optical path) aperiodic patterns with defined spatial frequency spectrum can be originated. Hence, by superimposing different beam combinations, different patterns are made possible.

== Coherence requirements ==
For interference lithography to be successful, coherence requirements must be met. First, a spatially coherent light source must be used. This is effectively a point light source in combination with a collimating lens. A laser or synchrotron beam are also often used directly without additional collimation. The spatial coherence guarantees a uniform wavefront prior to beam splitting. Second, it is preferred to use a monochromatic or temporally coherent light source. This is readily achieved with a laser but broadband sources would require a filter. The monochromatic requirement can be lifted if a diffraction grating is used as a beam splitter, since different wavelengths would diffract into different angles but eventually recombine anyway. Even in this case, spatial coherence and normal incidence would still be required.

== Beam splitter ==
Coherent light must be split into two or more beams prior to being recombined in order to achieve interference. Typical methods for beam splitting are Lloyd´s mirrors, prisms and diffraction gratings.

== Electron holographic lithography ==
The technique is readily extendible to electron waves as well, as demonstrated by the practice of electron holography. Spacings of a few nanometers or even less than a nanometer have been reported using electron holograms. This is because the wavelength of an electron is always shorter than for a photon of the same energy. The wavelength of an electron is given by the de Broglie relation $\lambda = \frac{h}{p}$, where $h$ is the Planck constant and $p$ is the electron momentum. For example, a 1 keV electron has a wavelength of slightly less than 0.04 nm. A 5 eV electron has a wavelength of 0.55 nm. This yields X-ray-like resolution without depositing significant energy. In order to ensure against charging, it must be ensured that electrons can penetrate sufficiently to reach the conducting substrate.

A fundamental concern for using low-energy electrons (≪100 eV) with this technique is their natural tendency to repel one another due to Coulomb forces as well as Fermi–Dirac statistics, though electron anti-bunching has been verified only in a single case.

== Atom holographic lithography ==
The interference of atomic de Broglie waves is also possible provided one can obtain coherent beams of cooled atoms. The momentum of an atom is even larger than for electrons or photons, allowing even smaller wavelengths, per the de Broglie relation. Generally the wavelength will be smaller than the diameter of the atom itself.

== Uses ==
The benefit of using interference lithography is the quick generation of dense features over a wide area without loss of focus. Seamless diffraction gratings on areas of more than one square meter have been originated by interference lithography. Hence, it is commonly used for the origination of master structures for subsequent micro or nano replication processes (e.g. nanoimprint lithography) or for testing photoresist processes for lithography techniques based on new wavelengths (e.g., EUV or 193 nm immersion). In addition, interfering laser beams of high-power pulsed lasers provides the opportunity of applying a direct treatment of the material's surface (including metals, ceramics and polymers) based on photothermal and/or photochemical mechanisms. Due to the above-mentioned characteristics, this method has been called in this case "Direct Laser Interference Patterning" (DLIP). Using DLIP, the substrates can be structured directly in one-step obtaining a periodic array on large areas in a few seconds. Such patterned surfaces can be used for different applications including tribology (wear and friction reduction), photovoltaics (increased photocurrent), or biotechnology. Electron interference lithography may be used for patterns which normally take too long for conventional electron beam lithography to generate.

The drawback of interference lithography is that it is limited to patterning arrayed features or uniformly distributed aperiodic patterns only. Hence, for drawing arbitrarily shaped patterns, other photolithography techniques are required. In addition, for electron interference lithography non-optical effects, such as secondary electrons from ionizing radiation or photoacid generation and diffusion, cannot be avoided with interference lithography. For instance, the secondary electron range is roughly indicated by the width of carbon contamination (~20 nm) at the surface induced by a focused (2 nm) electron beam. This indicates that the lithographic patterning of 20 nm half-pitch features or smaller will be significantly affected by factors other than the interference pattern, such as the cleanliness of the vacuum.
