= Alcatel Micro Machining Systems =

Alcatel Micro Machining Systems (AMMS) was a French manufacturer of Deep Reactive Ion Etching systems. The company's headquarters were located in Annecy, France.

== History ==
Alcatel Vacuum Technology, AMMS' original parent company, had a long-running business in plasma processing. Its first equipment based on an Alcatel patented Inductive Coupled Plasma (ICP) source, with independent source power and substrate bias control for deep etching of silicon, was launched in 1993. AMMS was created as a subsidiary in 2006 to focus on silicon etching.

Alcatel Micro Machining Systems operated until 2008, when it was sold to the Tegal Company. In 2011 SPTS acquired Tegal's DRIE assets (formerly AMMS). The deal included the transfer to SPTS of the capital stock and operations of Tegal France SAS, a wholly owned Tegal subsidiary.

== Products ==
The company previously manufactured DRIE systems including:

- Notching free
- Profile control
- Dry release
- Patented Sharp process: Super High Aspect Ratio
- Tapered via
- High etch rate
- V shape
- Cryo process
- Through the wafer
- High etch rate and low roughness
- High aspect ratio for 3D
- Fused Silica etching
- Low smoothness
- High aspect ratio holes

== See also ==
- Deep Reactive Ion Etching
- Microelectromechanical systems
