= Ammonium hexafluorogallate =

Names
- IUPAC name triazanium;gallium;hexafluoride
- Other names Triammonium hexafluorogallate(3-)

Identifiers
| CAS Number | 14639-94-2 |
| 3D model (JSmol) | Interactive image |
| ChemSpider | 32697638 |
| PubChem CID | 73425411 |
| UNII | 4X2AHU48WW |
| CompTox Dashboard (EPA) | DTXSID50721652 |
- InChI: InChI=1S/6FH.Ga.3H3N/h6*1H;;3*1H3/q;;;;;;+3;;;/p-3 Key: VNTODJFLNIRXQJ-UHFFFAOYSA-K
- SMILES: [NH4+].[NH4+].[NH4+].[F-].[F-].[F-].[F-].[F-].[F-].[Ga+3]

Properties
| Chemical formula | F_{6}GaH_{12}N_{3} |
| Molar mass | 237.830 g·mol^{−1} |
| Appearance | colorless crystals |
| Density | 2.10 g/cm^{3} |
| Solubility in water | soluble |
- Except where otherwise noted, data are given for materials in their standard state (at 25 °C [77 °F], 100 kPa). Infobox references

Ammonium hexafluorogallate is an inorganic chemical compound with the chemical formula (NH_{4})_{3}GaF_{6}.

== Synthesis ==
A mechanochemical reaction between ammonium fluoride and gallium fluoride trihydrate (GaF_{3}·3H_{2}O) at a ratio of 3:1 produces the compound.

Also, a reaction of gallium(III) hydroxide, HF, and ammonium fluoride.

Ga(OH)_{3} + 3 HF + 3 NH_{4}F → (NH)_{3}GaF_{6} + 3 H_{2}O

== Physical properties ==
Ammonium hexafluorogallate occurs in two polymorphic forms: tetragonal at low temperature and cubic at high temperature, with both transforming reversibly.

It has colorless crystals, which are soluble in water.
