= Larry Hornbeck =

American physicist and inventor of the digital micromirror device (DMD)

Larry J. Hornbeck (born September 17, 1943) is an American physicist and inventor of the digital micromirror device (DMD). He took part in the development of the DLP cinema technology while working at Texas Instruments (TI).

== Life and career ==
Larry Hornbeck received a Ph.D. in physics from Case Western Reserve University in 1974. He joined TI in 1973 and he began work on optical microelectromechanical systems in 1977.

Larry Hornbeck had manufactured and demonstrated the first DMD in 1987.

In 2007, Hornbeck was elected a member of the National Academy of Engineering for the invention and development of the DMD and its application to projection display technology.

== Awards and honors ==
- Prize for Industrial Applications of Physics (2014–2015)
- Progress Medal from the Royal Photographic Society (2009)
- Elected member of the National Academy of Engineering (2007)
- Academy Award of Merit "For the invention of digital micromirror technology as used in DLP Cinema projection" (2015)

== Bibliography ==
- Philippe Binant, "Au cœur de la projection numérique", Actions, Kodak, Paris, Vol. 29, pp. 12-13 (2007).
- Larry Hornbeck, "Digital Light Processing and MEMS : an overview", Texas Instruments, Dallas, Texas.
