= Barbara Abraham-Shrauner =

American physicist, applied mathematician, and electrical engineer

Barbara Wayne Abraham‑Shrauner
- Education: University of Colorado Boulder (B.S.); Harvard University (M.S., Ph.D.)
- Awards: Fellow of the American Physical Society (1999)
- Scientific career
- Fields: Physics, Applied mathematics, Electrical engineering
- Institutions: Washington University in St. Louis

Barbara Wayne Abraham-Shrauner is an American physicist, applied mathematician, and electrical engineer. She was known for her research on magnetohydrodynamics and plasma phenomena, including mathematical modeling of shocks and Alfvén waves, observation of the solar wind, and applications to the plasma etching of semiconductors, as well as on hidden symmetries and nonlocal symmetries in differential equations. She is retired as a professor of electrical and systems engineering at the McKelvey School of Engineering at Washington University in St. Louis.

== Education and career ==
Abraham-Shrauner graduated from Madison High School in 1952. She earned her bachelor's degree from the University of Colorado Boulder in 1956. She earned a master's degree from Harvard University in 1957 and completed her Ph.D. there in 1962.

She joined Washington University in St. Louis faculty in 1966, after postdoctoral research at the Université libre de Bruxelles and NASA Ames Research Center, and retired from full-time service in 2003 at Washington University, where she continues to hold an affiliation as a part-time Senior Professor in the Department of Electrical and Systems Engineering.

== Recognition ==
Abraham-Shrauner was named a Fellow of the American Physical Society (APS) in 1999, after a nomination from the APS Division of Plasma Physics, "for important theoretical contributions to a broad range of plasma topics, including: space plasmas, nonlinear dynamics, and plasma processing". She is a part of the Barbara Abraham Shrauner Endowed Scholarship in Physics to award undergraduate students that are involved in pursuing Physics or Engineering Physics.

== Personal life ==
Abraham-Shrauner was married to James Ely Shrauner (1933–2015), a professor of physics in Arts and Sciences at Washington University in St. Louis.
