= Sunlit Chemical =

Taiwanese chemical company

- Founded: 1972; 54 years ago
- Headquarters: Taiwan
- Key people: Bryan Lin, President
- Number of employees: 200

Sunlit Chemical is a Taiwanese chemical company.

== History ==
Sunlit Chemical was founded in 1972. They were the first company in Taiwan to produce hydrofluoric acid and fluoride. In 2021 they controlled 75% of the global oral care sodium fluoride market.

== Operations ==
In 2022 Sunlit broke ground on a 900,000 ft^{2} manufacturing facility on a site in Phoenix, Arizona to supply a TSMC fab being built in the same city. They had acquired the 17-acre site in 2021.

== Products ==
- Sodium fluoride
- Hydrofluoric acid
- Ammonium fluoride
- Phosphoric acid
- Hydrogen fluoride
