= Alcatel (disambiguation) =

Alcatel was a French telecommunications company. It can also refer to:

- Alcatel-Lucent, formed in 2006 by the merger of Alcatel and Lucent Technologies
- Alcatel Mobile, a brand of mobile phones, tablets and wearables
- Alcatel Vacuum Technology, a former manufacturer of vacuum pumps
