= BHF (disambiguation) =

The British Heart Foundation is a charity based in Camden Town, London, England.

BHF may also refer to:

- Bahrain Handball Federation
- Bangladesh Handball Federation
- Bolivian hemorrhagic fever
- BHF Bank
- Brighthouse Financial, where BHF is its Nasdaq stock symbol
- Buffered HF
