= Plasma cleaning =

Cleaning method using gas

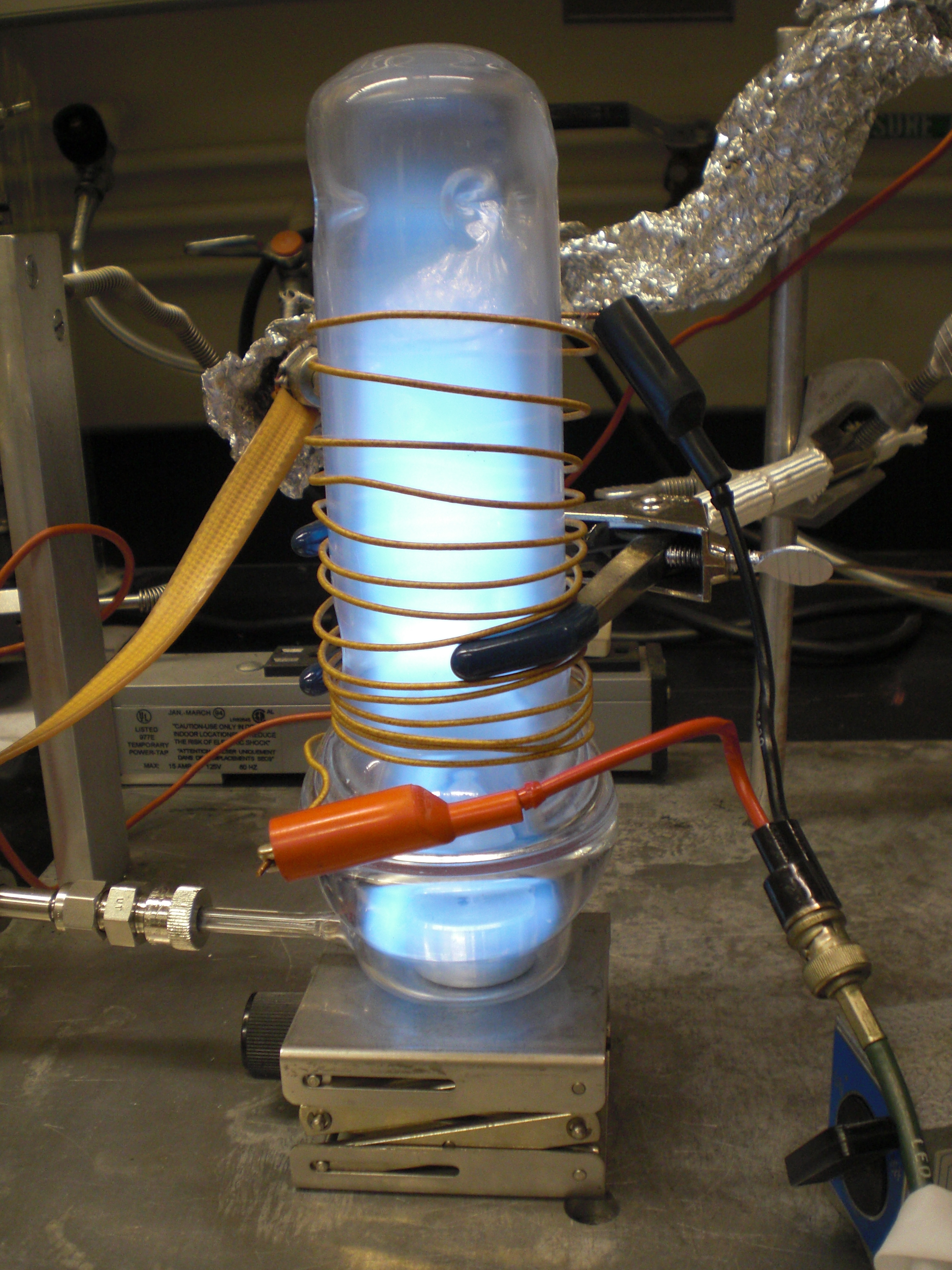
Fig. 1. The surface of a MEMS device is cleaned with bright, blue oxygen plasma in a plasma etcher to rid it of carbon contaminants. (100mTorr, 50W RF)

Plasma cleaning is the removal of impurities and contaminants from surfaces through the use of an energetic plasma or dielectric barrier discharge (DBD) plasma created from gaseous species. Gases such as argon and oxygen, as well as mixtures such as air and hydrogen/nitrogen are used. The plasma is created by using high frequency voltages (typically kHz to >MHz) to ionise the low pressure gas (typically around 1/1000 atmospheric pressure), although atmospheric pressure plasmas are now also common.

== Methods ==
In plasma, gas atoms are excited to higher energy states and also ionized. As the atoms and molecules 'relax' to their normal, lower energy states they release a photon of light, this results in the characteristic “glow” or light associated with plasma. Different gases give different colors. For example, oxygen plasma emits a light blue color.

A plasma’s activated species include atoms, molecules, ions, electrons, free radicals, metastables, and photons in the short wave ultraviolet (vacuum UV, or VUV for short) range. This mixture then interacts with any surface placed in the plasma.

If the gas used is oxygen, the plasma is an effective, economical, environmentally safe method for critical cleaning. The VUV energy is very effective in the breaking of most organic bonds (i.e., C–H, C–C, C=C, C–O, and C–N) of surface contaminants. This helps to break apart high molecular weight contaminants. A second cleaning action is carried out by the oxygen species created in the plasma (O_{2}^{+}, O_{2}^{−}, O_{3}, O, O^{+}, O^{−}, ionised ozone, metastable excited oxygen, and free electrons). These species react with organic contaminants to form H_{2}O, CO, CO_{2}, and lower molecular weight hydrocarbons. These compounds have relatively high vapor pressures and are evacuated from the chamber during processing. The resulting surface is ultra-clean. In Fig. 2, a relative content of carbon over material depth is shown before and after cleaning with excited oxygen.

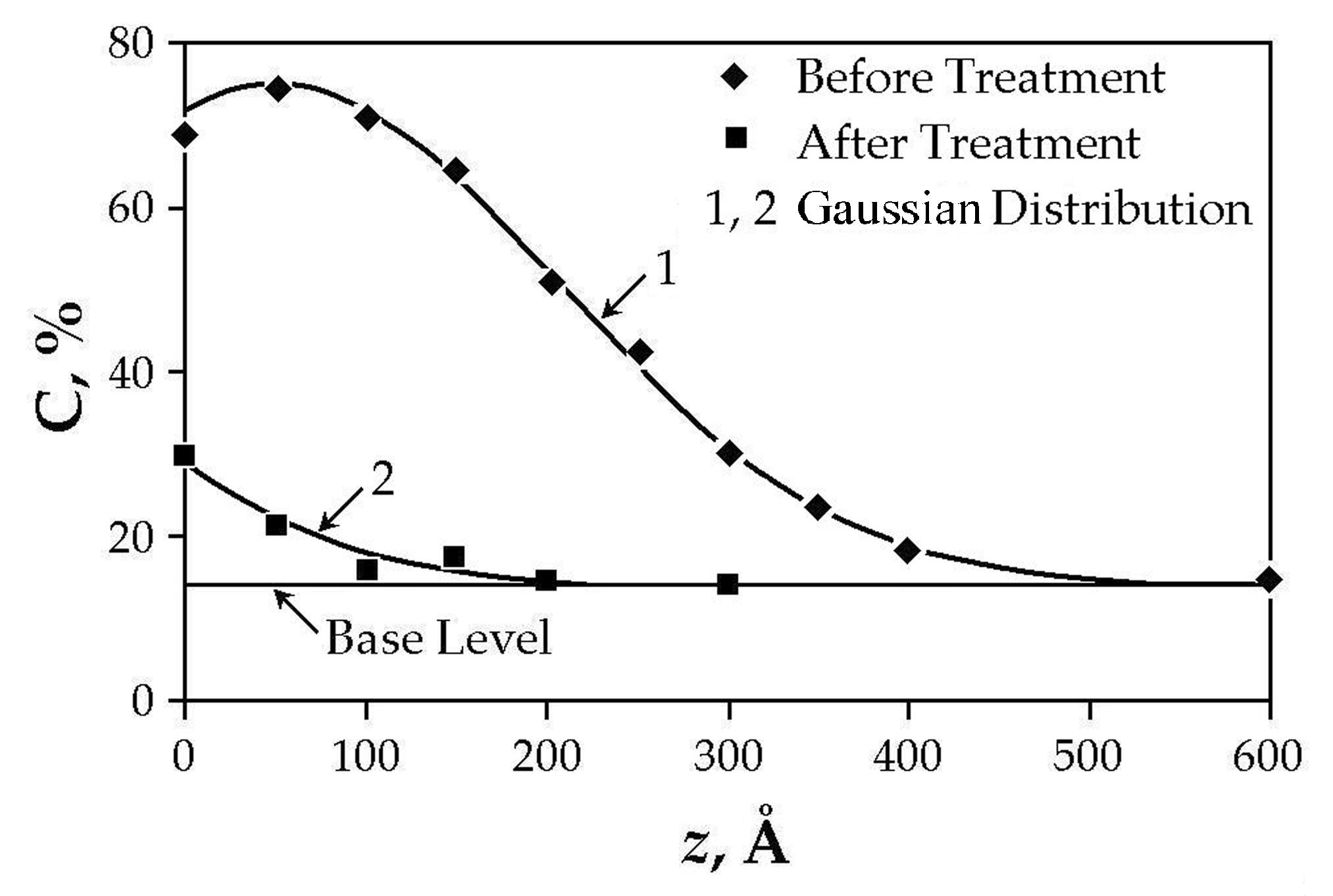
Fig. 2. Content of carbon over material depth z: before a sample treatment - diamond points and after the treatment during 1 s. - square points

If the part consists of easily oxidized materials such as silver or copper, the treatment uses inert gases such as argon or helium instead. Plasma activated atoms and ions behave like a molecular sandblast and can break down organic contaminants. These contaminants vaporize during processing and are evacuated from the chamber.

Most of these by-products are small quantities of gases, such as carbon dioxide and water vapor with trace amounts of carbon monoxide and other hydrocarbons.

Whether or not organic removal is complete can be assessed with contact angle measurements. When an organic contaminant is present, the contact angle of water with the device is high. Contaminant removal reduces the contact angle to that characteristic of contact with the pure substrate. In addition, XPS and AFM are often used to validate surface cleaning and sterilization applications.

If a surface to be treated is coated with a patterned conductive layer (metal, ITO), treatment by direct contact with plasma (capable for contraction to microarcs) could be destructive. In this case, cleaning by neutral atoms excited in plasma to metastable state can be applied. Results of the same applications to surfaces of glass samples coated with Cr and ITO layers are shown in Fig. 3.

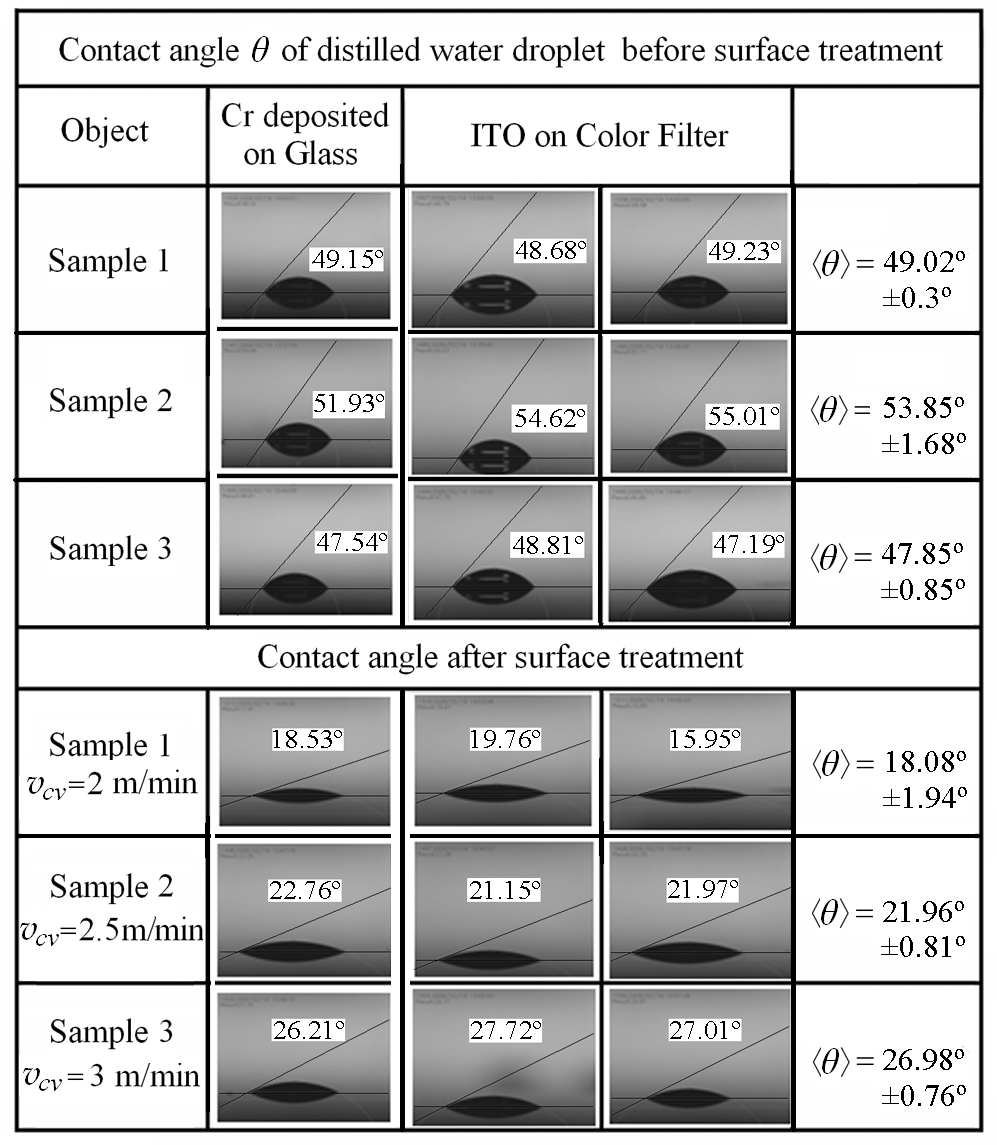
Fig. 3. Contact Angle of Water Droplet of 5 μl on glass coated with different materials.

After treatment, the contact angle of a water droplet is decreased becoming less than its value on the untreated surface. In Fig. 4, the relaxation curve for droplet footprint is shown for glass sample. A photograph of the same droplet on the untreated surface is shown in Fig. 4 inset. Surface relaxation time corresponding to a data shown in Fig. 4 is about 4 hours.

Plasma ashing is a process that uses plasma cleaning solely to remove carbon. Plasma ashing is always done with oxygen gas.

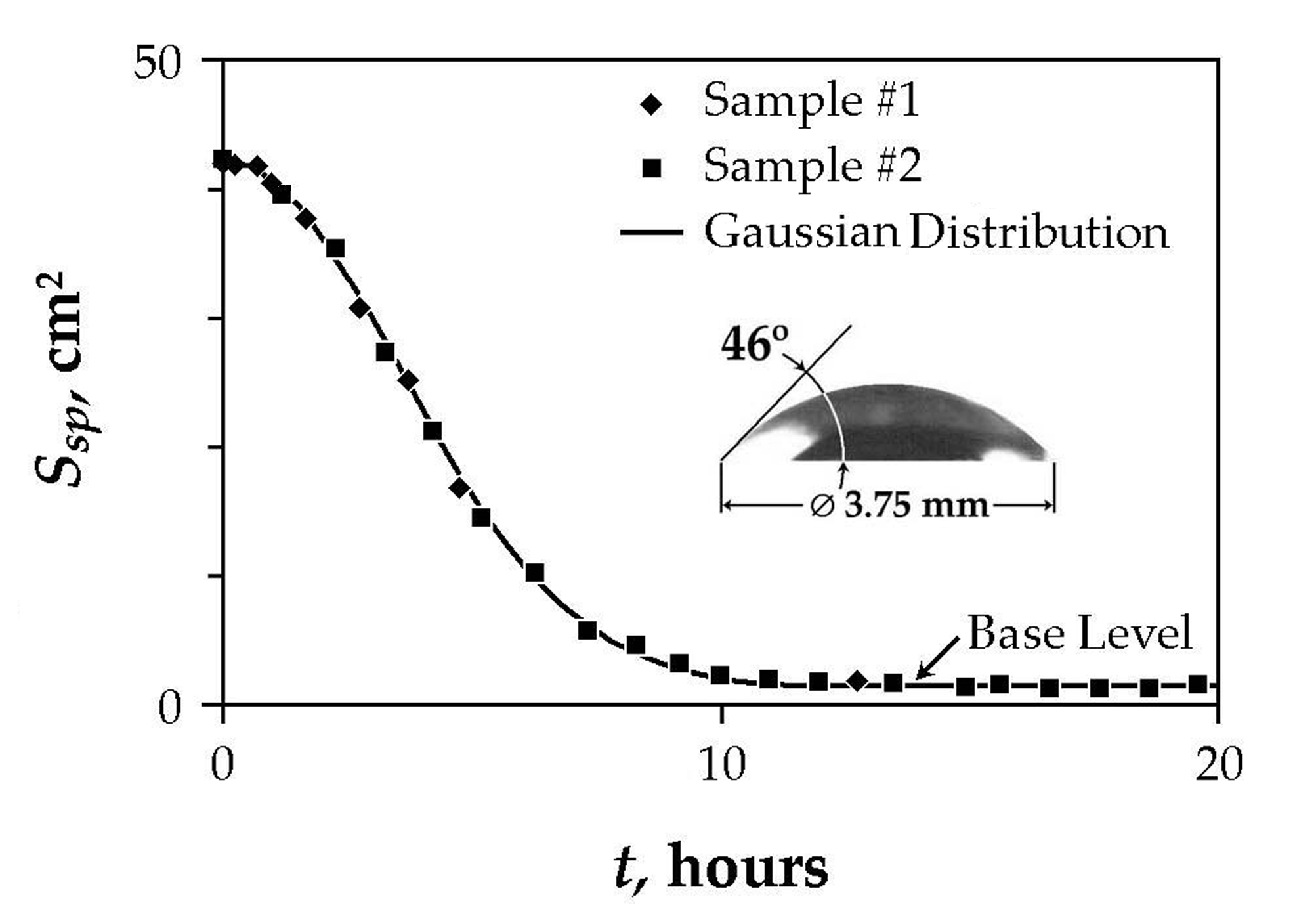
Fig. 4. Surface area of water droplet of 5 μl volume footprint on glass surface versus time t after its treatment. Droplet on untreated glass is shown in inset.

== Applications ==
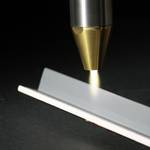
Fig. 5. Plasma beam cleaning a metal surface

=== Cleaning & Sterilization ===
Plasma cleaning removes organics contamination through chemical reaction or physical ablation of hydrocarbons on treated surfaces. Chemically reactive process gases (air, oxygen) react with hydrocarbon monolayers to form gaseous products that are swept away by the continuous gas flow in the plasma cleaner chamber. Plasma cleaning can be used in place of wet chemical processes, such as piranha etching, which contain dangerous chemicals, increase danger of reagent contamination and risk etching treated surfaces.

- Removal of Self Assembled Monolayers of alkanethiolates from gold surfaces
- Residual proteins on biomedical devices
- Nanoelectrode Cleaning

=== Life Sciences ===
Cell viability, function, proliferation and differentiation are determined by adhesion to their microenvironment. Plasma is often used as a chemical free means of adding biologically relevant functional groups (carbonyl, carboxyl, hydroxyl, amine, etc) to material surfaces. As a result, plasma cleaning improves material biocompatibility or bioactivity and removes contaminating proteins and microbes. Plasma cleaners are a general tool in the life sciences, being used to activate surfaces for cell culture, tissue engineering, implants and more.

- Tissue Engineering Substrates
- Polyethyleneterephthalate (PET) cell adhesion
- Improved Biocompatibility of Implants: vascular grafts, Stainless Steel Screws
- Long term cell confinement studies
- Plasma Lithography for Patterning Cell Culture Substrates
- Cell sorting by strength of adhesion
- Antibiotic removal by plasma activated steel shavings
- Single Cell Sequencing

=== Materials Science ===
Surface wetting and modification is a fundamental tool in materials science for enhancing material characteristics without affecting bulk properties. Plasma Cleaning is used to alter material surface chemistries through the introduction of polar functional groups. Increased surface hydrophilicity (wetting) following plasma treatment improves adhesion with aqueous coatings, adhesives, inks and epoxies:

- Enhanced Thermopower of Graphene Films
- Work function enhancement in polymer semiconductor heterostructures
- Improved adhesion of Ultra‐high modulus polyethylene (Spectra) fibers and aramid fibers
- Plasma Lithography for nanoscale surface structures and quantum dots
- Micropatterning of thin films

=== Microfluidics ===
The unique characteristics of micro or nanoscale fluid flow are harnessed by microfluidic devices for a wide variety of research applications. The most widely used material for microfluidic device prototyping is polydimethylsiloxane (PDMS), for its rapid development and adjustable material properties. Plasma cleaning is used to permanently bond PDMS Microfluidic chips with glass slides or PDMS slabs to create water-tight microchannels.

- Blood plasma separation
- Single Cell RNA Sequencing
- Electroosmotic Flow Valves
- Wettability Patterning in Microfluidic Devices
- Long Term Retention of Microfluidic Device Hydrophilicity
- Improved adhesion to poly (propylene)

=== Solar Cells & Photovoltaics ===
Plasma has been used to enhance the performance of solar cells and energy conversion within photovoltaic devices:

- Reduction of Molybdenum Oxide (MoO_{3}) enhances short circuit current density
- Modify TiO_{2} Nanosheets to improve hydrogen generation
- Enhanced conductivity of PEDOT:PSS for better efficiency in ITO-free perovskite solar cells
