= Digital micromirror device =

Mirror-based electronic display technology

A schematic of a Texas Instruments DMD chip and mirror pixels.

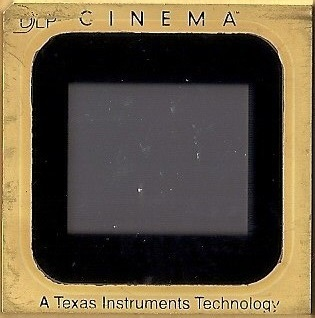
A DMD chip, used in most projectors and some TVs.

The digital micromirror device, or DMD, is the microoptoelectromechanical system (MOEMS) that is the core of the trademarked digital light processing (DLP) projection technology from Texas Instruments (TI). The device is used in digital projectors and consists of an array of millions of microscopic mirrors which can be individually tilted many thousand times per second, thereby creating the pixels of the projected images.

== History ==
The technology goes back to 1973 with Harvey C. Nathanson's (inventor of MEMS c. 1965) use of millions of microscopically small moving mirrors to create a video display of the type now found in digital projectors.

The project at Texas Instruments began as the deformable mirror device in 1977 using micromechanical analog light modulators. The DMD was invented by solid-state physicist and TI Fellow Emeritus Larry Hornbeck in 1987. The first analog DMD product was the TI DMD2000 airline ticket printer that went to market in 1990 and used a DMD instead of a laser scanner.

== Construction and use ==
A DMD chip has on its surface several hundred thousand microscopic mirrors arranged in a rectangular array which correspond to the pixels in the image to be displayed. The mirrors and supporting mechanical structures are constructed using surface micromachining. The mirrors can be individually rotated ±10–12°, to an on or off state. In the on state, light from the projector bulb is reflected into the lens making the pixel appear bright on the screen. In the off state, the light is directed elsewhere (usually onto a heatsink), making the pixel appear dark. To produce greyscales, the mirror is toggled on and off very quickly, and the ratio of on time to off time determines the shade produced (binary pulse-width modulation). Contemporary DMD chips can produce up to 1024 shades of gray (10 bits). (See Digital light processing for discussion of how color images are produced in DMD-based systems.)

Diagram of a digital micromirror showing the mirror mounted on the suspended yoke with the torsion spring running bottom left to top right (light grey), with the electrostatic pads of the memory cells below (top left and bottom right)

The mirrors themselves are made of aluminum and are around 16 micrometers across. Each mirror is mounted on a yoke which in turn is connected to two support posts by compliant torsion hinges. In this type of hinge, the axle is fixed at both ends and twists in the middle. Because of the small scale, hinge fatigue is not a problem, and tests have shown that even 1 trillion (10^{12}) operations do not cause noticeable damage. Tests have also shown that the hinges cannot be damaged by normal shock and vibration, since it is absorbed by the DMD superstructure.

Two pairs of electrodes control the position of the mirror by electrostatic attraction. Each pair has one electrode on each side of the hinge, with one of the pairs positioned to act on the yoke and the other acting directly on the mirror. The majority of the time, equal bias charges are applied to both sides simultaneously. Instead of flipping to a central position as one might expect, this actually holds the mirror in its current position. This is because the attraction force on the side that the mirror is already tilted towards is greater since that side is closer to the electrodes.

To move the mirrors, the required state is first loaded into an SRAM cell located beneath each pixel, which is also connected to the electrodes. Once all the SRAM cells have been loaded, the bias voltage is removed, allowing the charges from the SRAM cell to prevail, moving the mirror. When the bias is restored, the mirror is once again held in position, and the next required movement can be loaded into the memory cell.

The bias system is used because it reduces the voltage levels required to address the pixels such that they can be driven directly from the SRAM cell, and also because the bias voltage can be removed at the same time for the whole chip, so every mirror moves at the same instant. The advantages of the latter are more accurate timing and a more cinematic moving image.

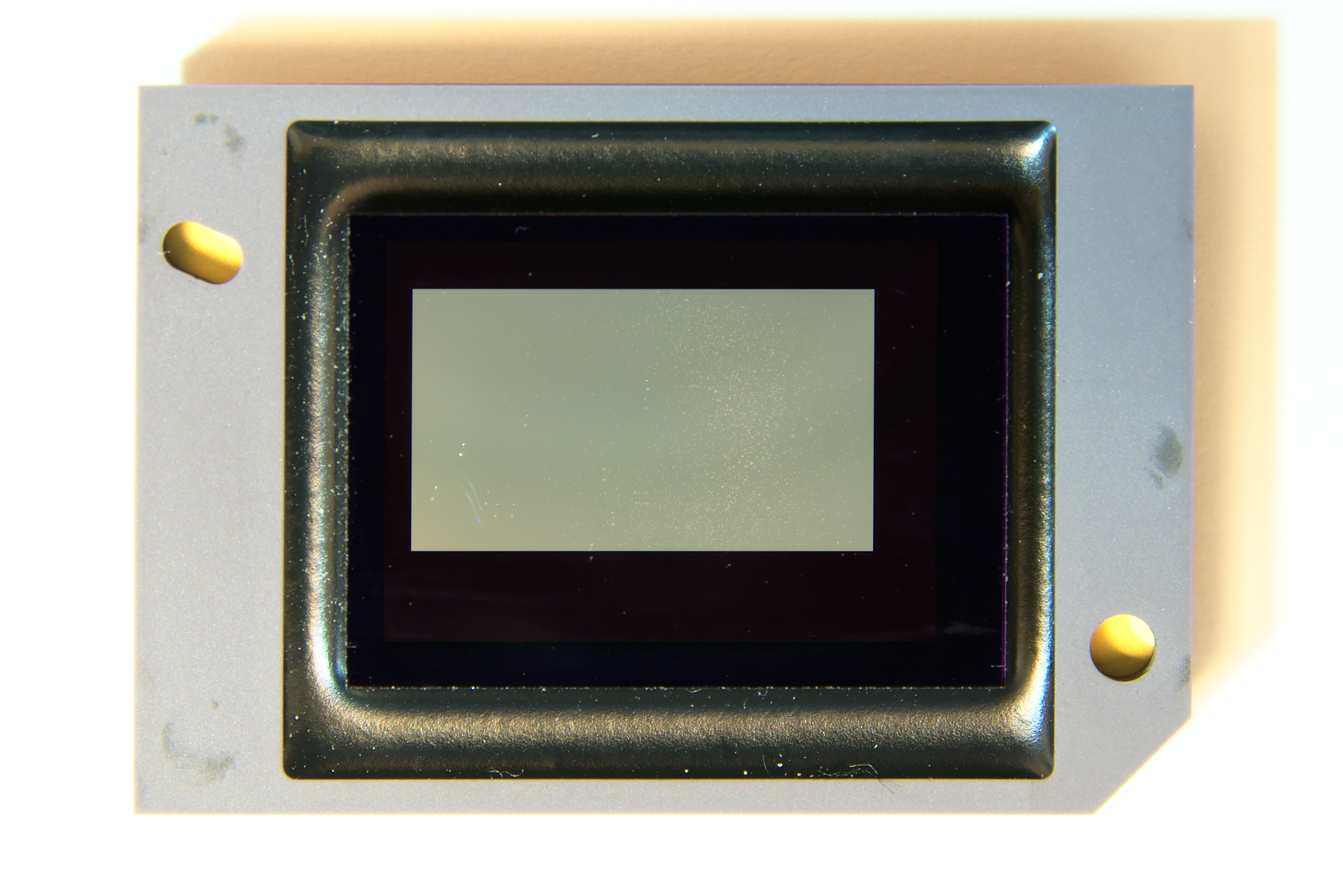
A broken DMD chip showing the "white dots" appearing on screen as "white pixels"

The described failure mode on these is caused by internal contamination usually due to seal failure corroding the mirror supports. A related failure was the glue used between 2007 and 2013, under which heat and light degrades and outgasses: this normally causes fogging inside the glass and eventually white/black pixels. This cannot usually be repaired, but defective DMD chips can sometimes be used for less critical projects not needing rapidly changing patterns if the existing bad pixels can be made part of the projected image or otherwise mapped out, including 3D scanning.

== Applications ==
- Televisions and HDTVs
- Holographic Versatile Discs
- Head-mounted displays
- Digital cinema
- DLP projectors
- Optical Metrology
- Laser Beam Machining
- Phase space measurement with forward modeling
- Spatial Light Modulation
- Multivariate optical computing
- Digital Holographic Tomography
- Optogenetics
- Flip-disc display
