= Undercut (etching) =

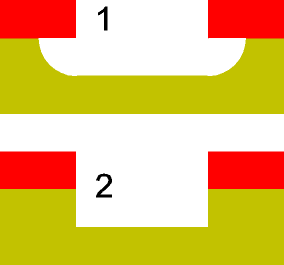
1. An isotropic etchant that creates an undercut; 2. An anisotropic etchant leaves no undercut

Undercuts from etching (microfabrication) are generally an unwanted side effect, however are sometimes used as a feature such as in the Niemeyer–Dolan technique. Undercuts from etching can occur from two common causes. The first is over etching, which means the etchant was applied too long. The second is due to an isotropic etchant, which means the etchant etches in all directions equally. To overcome this problem an anisotropic etchant is used.
