= Phase space measurement with forward modeling =

Phase space measurement with forward modeling is one approach to address the scattering issue in biomedical imaging. Scattering is one of the biggest problems in biomedical imaging, given that scattered light is eventually defocused, thus resulting in diffused images. Instead of removing the scattered light, this approach uses the information of scattered light to reconstruct the original light signals. This approach requires the phase space data of light in imaging system and a forward model to describe scattering events in a turbid medium. Phase space of light can be obtained by using digital micromirror device (DMD) or light field microscopy. Phase space measurement with forward modeling can be used in neuroscience to record neuronal activity in the brain.

== Concepts ==
Phase space of light is used to delineate the space and spatial frequency of light. As light propagates or scatters it will change its phase space as well. For example, as the position of light changes while staying in the same angle, simple propagation of light will shear the phase space of light. For scattering, since it diverges the light angle, the phase will be broadened after scattering. Therefore, scattering, and propagation of light can be modeled by the Wigner function which can generally describe light in wave optics. With a forward model to describe the propagation and scattering event in a scattering tissue, such as brain, a light field of a surface from point sources in a tissue can be estimated. To find the location of point sources of a target in a scattering medium, first, a light field of whole targets should be measured. Then simulated intensity plane is made by a phase space with all possible coordinates that may account for measured phase space. By applying optimization process with the non-negative least squares and a sparsity constraint, a sparse vector set that would correspond to the locations of targets of interest would be obtained by getting rid of non-possible options.

== An example of using a forward model for scattering events in a turbid medium ==
The Wigner quasiprobability distribution can be used for a forward model
$W(r,u) = \iint\limits_D <\tilde{f}^*(u+u'/2)\tilde{f}(u-u'/2)>e^{i2\pi u'r}d^2u'$ (1)

Eventually, scattering and propagation of light can be described as
$W(r,u) = \frac{-Nr^2}{2 \pi \lambda^2 \sigma^2 (Zd - Zs)^2} e^{\frac{Nr^2}{2 \lambda^2 \sigma^2 (Zd - Zs)^2} (r - rs + \lambda (Zd - \frac{Zd - Zs}{Nr}) u)^2}$ (2)

The weight sum of decomposed contribution is
$\hat I (r,u) = \sum_{rs,Zs} C(rs,Zs) W(r,u;rs,Zs)$ (3)
where $C(rs,Zs)$ is an coefficient that represents the intensity of light from a point source at the location $(rs,Zs)$

To obtain a sparse vector set $C(rs,Zs)$, solve the lasso problem
$\min_{c \geqslant 0} \sum_{r,u} \left\vert I(r,u) - \hat I (r,u) \right\vert ^2 + \mu \sum_{rs,Zs} \left\vert c(rs,Zs) \right\vert$ (4)
where $I(r,u)$ is the actual measured phase space and $\mu$ is an arbitrary coefficient that favors sparsity.

== Application ==
Phase space measurement with forward modeling can be used in neuroscience to record neuronal activity in the brain. Researchers have been widely using two-photon scanning microscopy to visualize neurons and their activity by imaging fluorescence emitted from calcium indicators expressed in neurons. However, two-photon excitation microscopy is slow, because it has to scan all the pixels one by one in the target of interest. One advantage of using Phase space measurement with forward modeling is fast, which largely depends on the speed of camera being used. A light field camera can capture an image with all the pixels in one frame at a time to speed up the frame rate of their system. This feature can facilitate voltage imaging in the brain to record action potentials.
