= Plasma ashing =

In semiconductor manufacturing plasma ashing is the process of removing the photoresist (light sensitive coating) from an etched wafer. Using a plasma source, a monatomic (single atom) substance known as a reactive species is generated. Oxygen or fluorine are the most common reactive species. Other gases used are N2/H2 where the H2 portion is 2%. The reactive species combines with the photoresist to form ash which is removed with a vacuum pump.

Typically, monatomic oxygen plasma is created by exposing oxygen gas (O_{2}) at a low pressure to high power radio waves, which ionise it. This process is done under vacuum in order to create a plasma. As the plasma is formed, many free radicals and also oxygen ions are created. These ions could damage the wafer due to the electric field build up between the plasma and the wafer surface. Newer, smaller circuitry is increasingly susceptible to these charged particles that can get implanted into the surface. Originally, plasma was generated in the process chamber, but as the need to get rid of the ions has increased, many machines now use a downstream plasma configuration, where plasma is formed remotely and the desired particles are channeled to the wafer. This allows electrically charged particles time to recombine before they reach the wafer surface, and prevents damage to the wafer surface.

== Types ==
Two forms of plasma ashing are typically performed on wafers. High temperature ashing, or stripping, is performed to remove as much photo resist as possible, while the "descum" process is used to remove residual photo resist in trenches. The main difference between the two processes is the temperature the wafer is exposed to while in an ashing chamber. Typical issues arise when this photoresist has undergone an implant step previously and heavy metal are embedded in the photoresist and it has experienced high temperatures causing it to be resistant to oxidizing.

Monatomic oxygen is electrically neutral and although it does recombine during the channeling, it does so at a slower rate than the positively or negatively charged free radicals, which attract one another. This means that when all of the free radicals have recombined, there is still a portion of the active species available for process. Because a large portion of the active species is lost to recombination, process times may take longer. To some extent, these longer process times can be mitigated by increasing the temperature of the reaction area. This also contribute to the observation of the spectral optical traces, these can be what is normally expected when the emission declines, the process is over; it can also mean that spectral lines increase in illuminance as the available reactants are consumed causing a rise in certain spectral lines representing the available ionic species.

== See also ==
- Plasma etching
