= Isotropic etching =

Multidirectional etching in semiconductor manufacturing

In semiconductor manufacturing, isotropic etching is a method commonly used to remove material from a substrate via a chemical process using an etchant substance. The etchant may be in liquid-, gas- or plasma-phase, although liquid etchants such as buffered hydrofluoric acid (BHF) for silicon dioxide etching are more commonly used. Unlike anisotropic etching, isotropic etching does not etch in a single direction, but rather etches in multiple directions within the substrate. Any horizontal component of the etch direction may therefore result in undercutting of patterned areas, and significant changes to device characteristics. Isotropic etching may occur unavoidably, or it may be desirable for process reasons.
