= Deep reactive-ion etching =

Highly anisotropic etch process

Diagram of deep reactive ion etching (DRIE) process with etch stop.

Deep reactive-ion etching (DRIE) is a special subclass of reactive-ion etching (RIE). It enables highly anisotropic etch process used to create deep penetration, steep-sided holes and trenches in wafers/substrates, typically with high aspect ratios. It was developed for microelectromechanical systems (MEMS), which require these features, but is also used to excavate trenches for high-density capacitors for DRAM and more recently for creating through-silicon vias (TSVs) in advanced 3D wafer level packaging technology.

In DRIE, the substrate is placed inside a reactor, and several gases are introduced. A plasma is struck in the gas mixture which breaks the gas molecules into ions. The ions are accelerated towards, and react with the surface of the material being etched, forming another gaseous element. This is known as the chemical part of the reactive ion etching. There is also a physical part, if ions have enough energy, they can knock atoms out of the material to be etched without chemical reaction.

There are two main technologies for high-rate DRIE: cryogenic and Bosch, although the Bosch process is the only recognised production technique. Both Bosch and cryogenic processes can fabricate 90° (truly vertical) walls, but often the walls are slightly tapered, e.g. 88° ("reentrant") or 92° ("retrograde").

Another mechanism is sidewall passivation: SiO_{x}F_{y} functional groups (which originate from sulphur hexafluoride and oxygen etch gases) condense on the sidewalls, and protect them from lateral etching. As a combination of these processes, deep vertical structures can be made.

== Cryogenic process ==
In cryogenic-DRIE, the wafer is chilled to −110 °C (163 K). The low temperature slows down the chemical reaction that produces isotropic etching. However, ions continue to bombard upward-facing surfaces and etch them away. This process produces trenches with highly vertical sidewalls. The primary issues with cryo-DRIE is that the standard masks on substrates crack under the extreme cold, plus etch by-products have a tendency of depositing on the nearest cold surface, i.e. the substrate or electrode.

== Bosch process ==
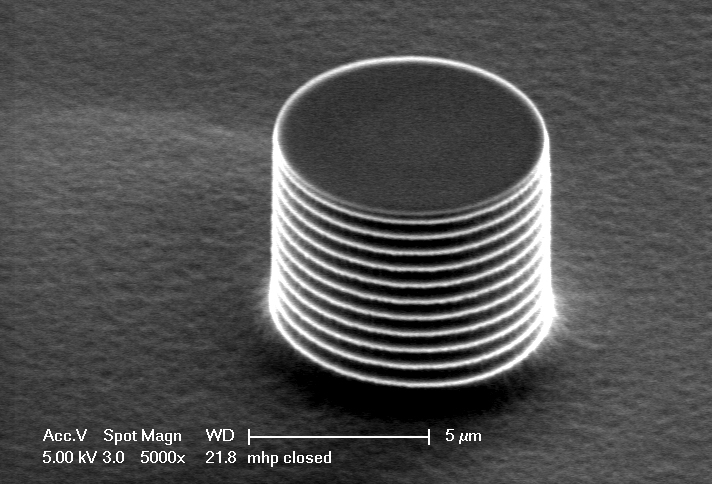
A silicon micro-pillar fabricated using the Bosch process

The Bosch process, named after the German company Robert Bosch GmbH which patented the process, also known as pulsed or time-multiplexed etching, alternates repeatedly between two modes to achieve nearly vertical structures:

1. A standard, nearly isotropic plasma etch. The plasma contains some ions, which attack the wafer from a nearly vertical direction. Sulfur hexafluoride [SF_{6}] is often used for silicon.
2. Deposition of a chemically inert passivation layer. (For instance, Octafluorocyclobutane [C_{4}F_{8}] source gas yields a substance similar to Teflon.)

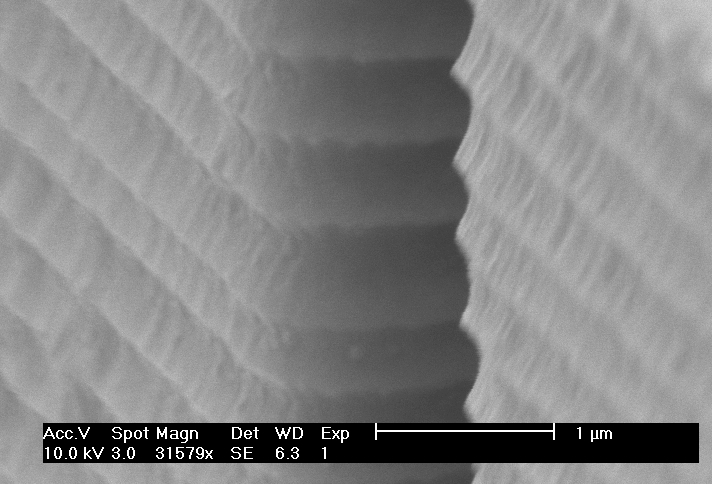
Undulating sidewall of a silicon structure created using the Bosch process

Each phase lasts for several seconds. The passivation layer protects the entire substrate from further chemical attack and prevents further etching. However, during the etching phase, the directional ions that bombard the substrate attack the passivation layer at the bottom of the trench (but not along the sides). They collide with it and sputter it off, exposing the substrate to the chemical etchant.

These etch/deposit steps are repeated many times over resulting in a large number of very small isotropic etch steps taking place only at the bottom of the etched pits. To etch through a 0.5 mm silicon wafer, for example, 100–1000 etch/deposit steps are needed. The two-phase process causes the sidewalls to undulate with an amplitude of about 100–500 nm. The cycle time can be adjusted: short cycles yield smoother walls, and long cycles yield a higher etch rate.

== Applications ==
Etching depth typically depends on the application:

- in DRAM memory circuits, capacitor trenches may be 10–20 μm deep,
- in MEMS, DRIE is used for anything from a few micrometers to 0.5 mm.
- in irregular chip dicing, DRIE is used with a novel hybrid soft/hard mask to achieve sub-millimeter etching to dice silicon dies into lego-like pieces with irregular shapes.
- in flexible electronics, DRIE is used to make traditional monolithic CMOS devices flexible by reducing the thickness of silicon substrates to few to tens of micrometers.

DRIE is distinguished from RIE by its etch depth. Practical etch depths for RIE (as used in IC manufacturing) would be limited to around 10 μm at a rate up to 1 μm/min, while DRIE can etch features much greater, up to 600 μm or more with rates up to 20 μm/min or more in some applications.

DRIE of glass requires high plasma power, which makes it difficult to find suitable mask materials for truly deep etching. Polysilicon and nickel are used for 10–50 μm etched depths. In DRIE of polymers, Bosch process with alternating steps of SF_{6} etching and C_{4}F_{8} passivation take place. Metal masks can be used, however they are expensive to use since several additional photo and deposition steps are always required. Metal masks are not necessary however on various substrates (Si [up to 800 μm], InP [up to 40 μm] or glass [up to 12 μm]) if using chemically amplified negative resists.

Gallium ion implantation can be used as etch mask in cryo-DRIE. Combined nanofabrication process of focused ion beam and cryo-DRIE was first reported by N Chekurov et al in their article "The fabrication of silicon nanostructures by local gallium implantation and cryogenic deep reactive ion etching".

=== Precision machinery ===
DRIE has enabled the use of silicon mechanical components in high-end wristwatches. According to an engineer at Cartier, "There is no limit to geometric shapes with DRIE,". With DRIE it is possible to obtain an aspect ratio of 30 or more, meaning that a surface can be etched with a vertical-walled trench 30 times deeper than its width.

This has allowed for silicon components to be substituted for some parts which are usually made of steel, such as the hairspring. Silicon is lighter and harder than steel, which carries benefits but makes the manufacturing process more challenging.

== See also ==
- Microelectromechanical systems
