= Microoptomechanical systems =

Micro-systems which use optical and mechanical, but not electronic components

Microoptomechanical systems (MOMS), also written as micro-optomechanical systems, are a special class of microelectromechanical systems (MEMS) which use optical and mechanical, but not electronic components.

== See also ==
- Microoptoelectromechanical systems (MOEMS)
- Nanoelectromechanical systems (NEMS)
