= Ethylenediamine pyrocatechol =

Etchant solution

Ethylenediamine pyrocatechol (EDP), also known as ethylenediamine-pyrocatechol-water (EPW), is an anisotropic etchant solution for silicon. A typical formulation consists of ethylenediamine, pyrocatechol, pyrazine and water. It is carcinogenic and very corrosive. It is mainly used in research labs, and is not used in mainstream semiconductor fabrication processes.
