= Microoptoelectromechanical systems =

Microoptoelectromechanical systems (MOEMS), also known as optical MEMS, are integrations of mechanical, optical, and electrical systems that involve sensing or manipulating optical signals at a very small size. MOEMS includes a wide variety of devices, for example optical switch, optical cross-connect, tunable VCSEL, microbolometers. These devices are usually fabricated using micro-optics and standard micromachining technologies using materials like silicon, silicon dioxide, silicon nitride and gallium arsenide.

== Merging technologies ==
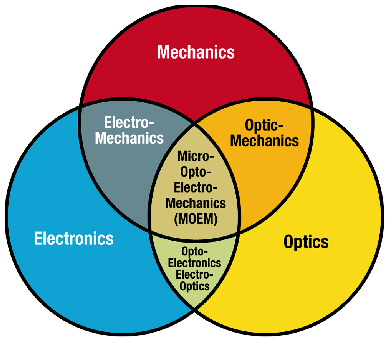
This figure first was introduced by M. Edward Motamedi

Diagram of a digital micromirror showing the mirror mounted on the suspended yoke with the torsion spring running bottom left to top right (light grey), with the electrostatic pads of the memory cells below (top left and bottom right)

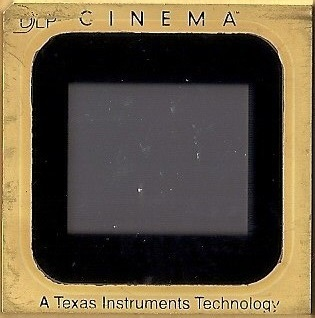
DLP CINEMA. A Texas Instruments Technology

MOEMS includes two major technologies, microelectromechanical systems and micro-optics. Both these two technologies independently involve in batch processing similar to integrated circuits, and micromachining similar to fabrication of microsensor.

== History of MOEMS ==
During 1991-1993, Dr. M. Edward Motamedi, a former Rockwell International innovator in the areas of both microelectromechanical systems and micro-optics, used internally the acronym of MOEMS for microoptoelectromechanical systems. This was to distinguish between optical MEMS and MOEMS, where optical MEMS could include bulk optics but MOEMS is truly based on microtechnology where MOEMS devices are batch-processed exactly like integrated circuits, but this is not true in most cases for optical MEMS.

In 1993, Dr. Motamedi officially introduced MOEMS for the first time, as the powerful combination of MEMS and micro-optics, in an invited talk at the SPIE Critical Reviews of Optical Science and Technology conference in San Diego. In this talk Dr. Motamedi introduced the figure below, for showing that MOEMS is the interaction of three major microtechnologies; namely micro-optics, micromechanics, and microelectronics.

== See also ==
- Microoptomechanical systems
- Nanoelectromechanical systems
- Microfabrication
- Microscanner

== Bibliography ==
- Rai-Choudhury, P., ed. (2000). MEMS and MOEMS. Technology and applications. SPIE Press. ISBN 978-0-8194-3716-7.
- Solgaard, O.; Godil, A.A.; Howe, R.T.; Lee, L.P.; Peter, Y.-A.; Zappe, H. (June 2014). "Optical MEMS: From micromirrors to complex systems". Journal of Microelectromechanical Systems. 23 (3): 517–538. Bibcode:2014JMemS..23..517S. doi:10.1109/JMEMS.2014.2319266.
