= Etching (microfabrication) =

Technique in microfabrication used to remove material and create structures

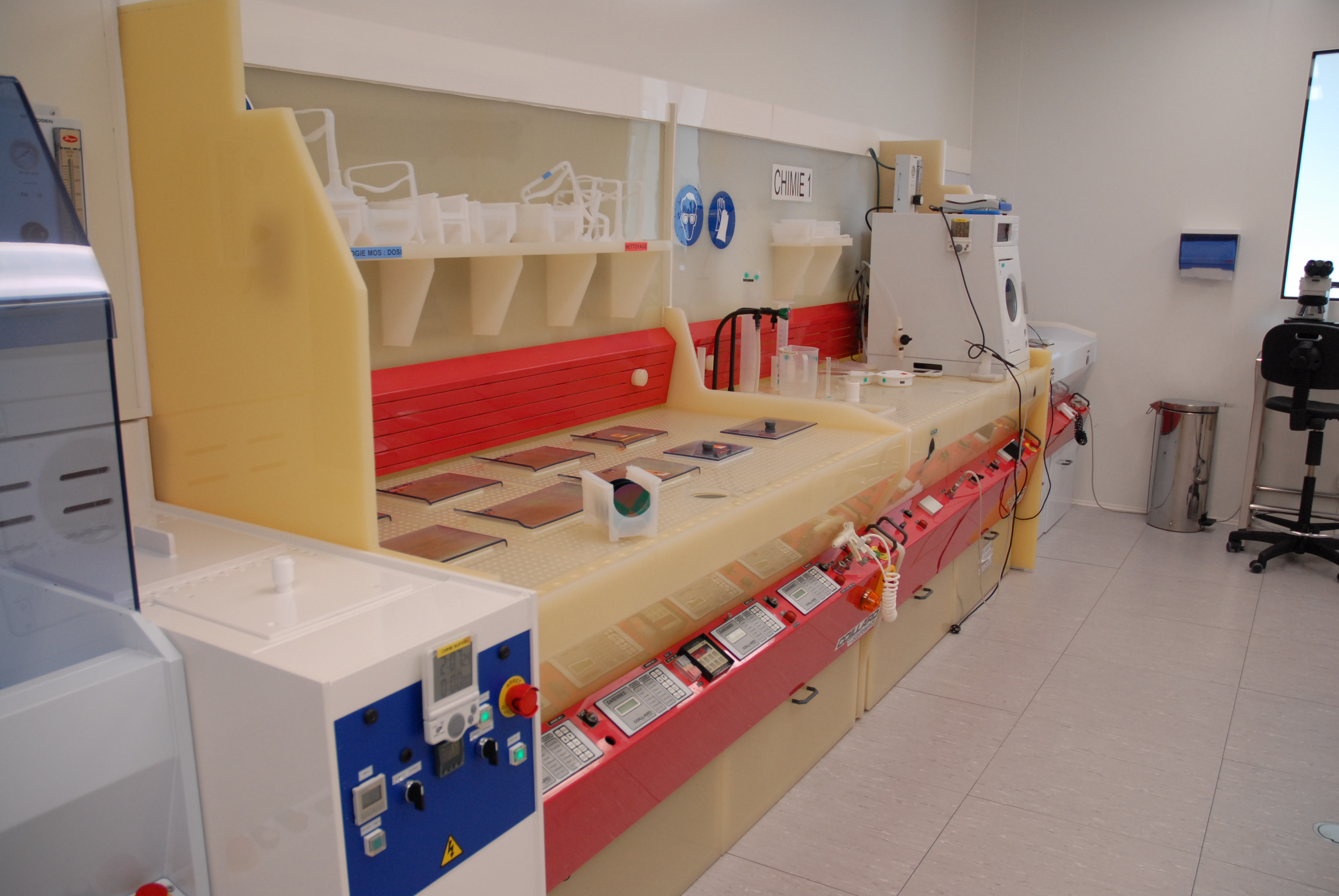
Etching tanks used to perform piranha, hydrofluoric acid or RCA clean on 4-inch wafer batches at LAAS technological facility in Toulouse, France

Etching is used in microfabrication to chemically remove layers from the surface of a wafer during manufacturing. Etching is a critically important process module in fabrication, and every wafer undergoes many etching steps before it is complete.

For many etch steps, part of the wafer is protected from the etchant by a "masking" material which resists etching. In some cases, the masking material is a photoresist which has been patterned using photolithography. Other situations require a more durable mask, such as silicon nitride.

== Etching media and technology ==
The two fundamental types of etchants are liquid-phase ("wet") and plasma-phase ("dry"). Each of these exists in several varieties.

=== Wet etching ===
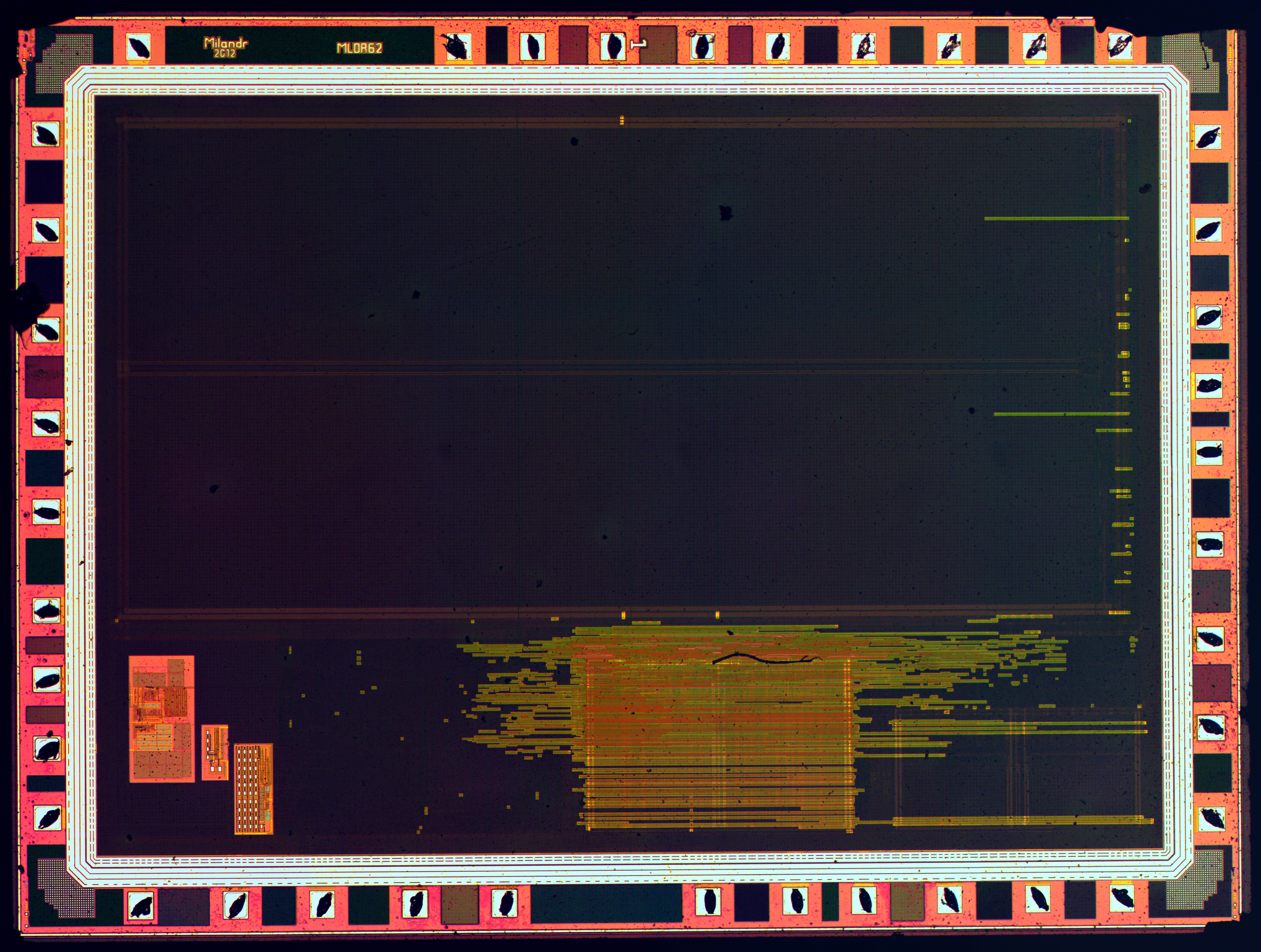
Radiation hardened die of the 1886VE10 microcontroller prior to metalization etching

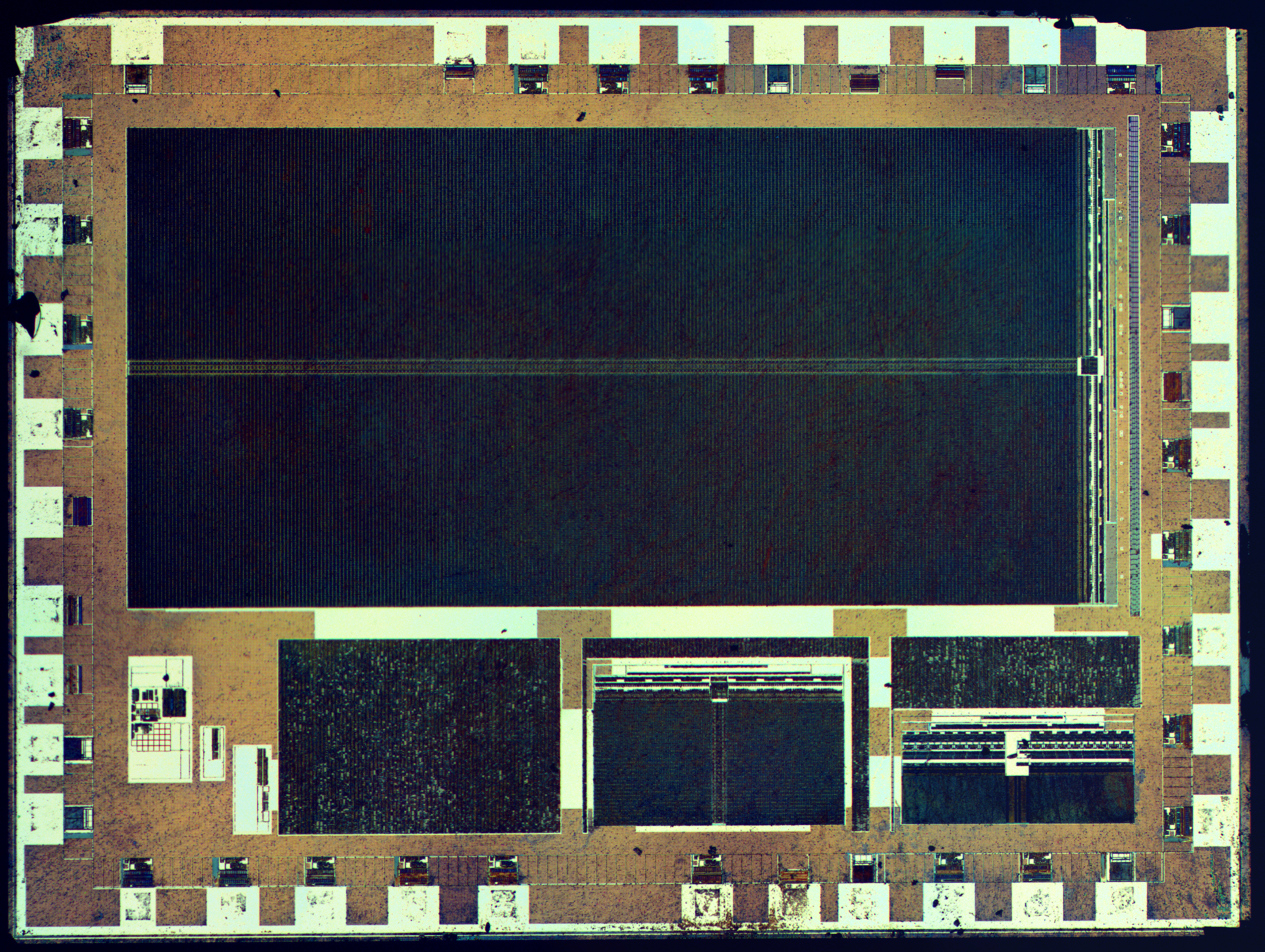
Radiation hardened die of the 1886VE10 microcontroller after a metalization etching process has been used

The first etching processes used liquid-phase ("wet") etchants. This process is now largely outdated but was used up until the late 1980s when it was superseded by dry plasma etching. The wafer can be immersed in a bath of etchant, which must be agitated to achieve good process control. For instance, buffered hydrofluoric acid (BHF) is used commonly to etch silicon dioxide over a silicon substrate.

Different specialized etchants can be used to characterize the surface etched.

Wet etchants are usually isotropic, which leads to a large bias when etching thick films. They also require the disposal of large amounts of toxic waste. For these reasons, they are seldom used in state-of-the-art processes. However, the photographic developer used for photoresist resembles wet etching.

As an alternative to immersion, single wafer machines use the Bernoulli principle to employ a gas (usually, pure nitrogen) to cushion and protect one side of the wafer while etchant is applied to the other side. It can be done to either the front side or back side. The etch chemistry is dispensed on the top side when in the machine and the bottom side is not affected. This etching method is particularly effective just before "backend" processing (BEOL), where wafers are normally very much thinner after wafer backgrinding, and very sensitive to thermal or mechanical stress. Etching a thin layer of even a few micrometres will remove microcracks produced during backgrinding resulting in the wafer having dramatically increased strength and flexibility without breaking.

=== Anisotropic wet etching (Orientation dependent etching) ===
An anisotropic wet etch on a silicon wafer creates a cavity with a trapezoidal cross-section. The bottom of the cavity is a {100} plane (see Miller indices), and the sides are {111} planes. The blue material is an etch mask, and the green material is silicon.

Some wet etchants etch crystalline materials at very different rates depending upon which crystal face is exposed. In single-crystal materials (e.g. silicon wafers), this effect can allow very high anisotropy, as shown in the figure. The term "crystallographic etching" is synonymous with "anisotropic etching along crystal planes".

However, for some non-crystal materials like glass, there are unconventional ways to etch in an anisotropic manner. The authors employ multistream laminar flow that contains etching non-etching solutions to fabricate a glass groove. The etching solution at the center is flanked by non-etching solutions and the area contacting etching solutions is limited by the surrounding non-etching solutions. The etching direction is thereby mainly vertical to the glass surface. The scanning electron microscopy (SEM) images demonstrate the breaking of the conventional theoretical limit of aspect ratio (width/height=0.5) and contribute a two-fold improvement (width/height=1).

Several anisotropic wet etchants are available for silicon, all of them hot aqueous caustics. For instance, potassium hydroxide (KOH) displays an etch rate selectivity 400 times higher in <100> crystal directions than in <111> directions. EDP (an aqueous solution of ethylene diamine and pyrocatechol), displays a <100>/<111> selectivity of 17X, does not etch silicon dioxide as KOH does, and also displays high selectivity between lightly doped and heavily boron-doped (p-type) silicon. Use of these etchants on wafers that already contain CMOS integrated circuits requires protecting the circuitry. KOH may introduce mobile potassium ions into silicon dioxide, and EDP is highly corrosive and carcinogenic, so care is required in their use. Tetramethylammonium hydroxide (TMAH) presents a safer alternative than EDP, with a 37X selectivity between {100} and {111} planes in silicon.

Etching a (100) silicon surface through a rectangular hole in a masking material, like a hole in a layer of silicon nitride, creates a pit with flat sloping {111}-oriented sidewalls and a flat (100)-oriented bottom. The {111}-oriented sidewalls have an angle to the surface of the wafer of:

$$\arctan\sqrt{2}=54.7^\circ$$

If the etching is continued "to completion", i.e. until the flat bottom disappears, the pit becomes a trench with a V-shaped cross-section. If the original rectangle was a perfect square, the pit when etched to completion displays a pyramidal shape.

The undercut, δ, under an edge of the masking material is given by:

$$\delta = \frac{\sqrt{6} D}{S}=\frac{\sqrt{6} R_{100}T}{R_{100}/R_{111}}=\sqrt{6}TR_{111}$$,

where R_{xxx} is the etch rate in the <xxx> direction, T is the etch time, D is the etch depth and S is the anisotropy of the material and etchant.

Different etchants have different anisotropies. Below is a table of common anisotropic etchants for silicon:

Etchant	Operating temp (°C)	R_{100} (μm/min)	S=R_{100}/R_{111}	Mask materials
Ethylenediamine pyrocatechol (EDP)	110	0.47	17	SiO_{2}, Si_{3}N_{4}, Au, Cr, Ag, Cu
Potassium hydroxide/Isopropyl alcohol (KOH/IPA)	50	1.0	400	Si_{3}N_{4}, SiO_{2} (etches at 2.8 nm/min)
Tetramethylammonium hydroxide (TMAH)	80	0.6	37	Si_{3}N_{4}, SiO_{2}

=== Plasma etching ===
Simplified illustration of dry etching using positive photoresist during a photolithography process in semiconductor microfabrication. Note: Not to scale.

Modern very large scale integration (VLSI) processes avoid wet etching, and use plasma etching instead. Plasma etchers can operate in several modes by adjusting the parameters of the plasma. Ordinary plasma etching operates between 0.1 and 5 Torr. (This unit of pressure, commonly used in vacuum engineering, equals approximately 133.3 pascals.) The plasma produces energetic free radicals, neutrally charged, that react at the surface of the wafer.

Since neutral particles attack the wafer from all angles, this process is isotropic. Plasma etching can be isotropic, i.e., exhibiting a lateral undercut rate on a patterned surface approximately the same as its downward etch rate, or can be anisotropic, i.e., exhibiting a smaller lateral undercut rate than its downward etch rate. Such anisotropy is maximized in deep reactive ion etching (DRIE). The use of the term anisotropy for plasma etching should not be conflated with the use of the same term when referring to orientation-dependent etching.

The source gas for the plasma usually contains small molecules rich in chlorine or fluorine. For instance, carbon tetrachloride (CCl_{4}) etches silicon and aluminium, and trifluoromethane etches silicon dioxide and silicon nitride. A plasma containing oxygen is used to oxidize ("ash") photoresist and facilitate its removal.

Ion milling, or sputter etching, uses lower pressures, often as low as 10^{−4} Torr (10 mPa). It bombards the wafer with energetic ions of noble gases, often Ar^{+}, which knock atoms from the substrate by transferring momentum. Because the etching is performed by ions, which approach the wafer approximately from one direction, this process is highly anisotropic. On the other hand, it tends to display poor selectivity. Reactive-ion etching (RIE) operates under conditions intermediate between sputter and plasma etching (between 10^{−3} and 10^{−1} Torr). Deep reactive-ion etching (DRIE) modifies the RIE technique to produce deep, narrow features.

== Figures of merit ==
If the etch is intended to make a cavity in a material, the depth of the cavity may be controlled approximately using the etching time and the known etch rate. More often, though, etching must entirely remove the top layer of a multilayer structure, without damaging the underlying or masking layers. The etching system's ability to do this depends on the ratio of etch rates in the two materials (selectivity).

Some etches undercut the masking layer and form cavities with sloping sidewalls. The distance of undercutting is called bias. Etchants with large bias are called isotropic, because they erode the substrate equally in all directions. Modern processes greatly prefer anisotropic etches, because they produce sharp, well-controlled features.

Selectivity
Isotropy
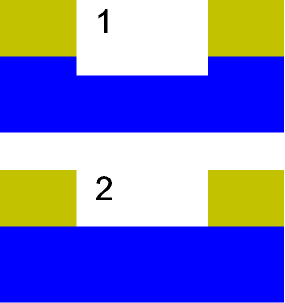
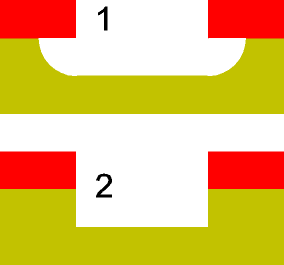
Blue: layer to remain
1. A poorly selective etch removes the top layer but also attacks the underlying material.
2. A highly selective etch leaves the underlying material unharmed.
Red: masking layer; yellow: layer to be removed
1. A perfectly isotropic etch produces round sidewalls.
2. A perfectly anisotropic etch produces vertical sidewalls.

== Common etch processes used in microfabrication ==
Etchants for common microfabrication materials
Material to be etched	Wet etchants	Plasma etchants
Aluminium (Al)	80% phosphoric acid (H_{3}PO_{4}) + 5% acetic acid + 5% nitric acid (HNO_{3}) + 10% water (H_{2}O) at 35–45 °C	Cl_{2}, CCl_{4}, SiCl_{4}, BCl_{3}
Indium tin oxide [ITO] (In_{2}O_{3}:SnO_{2})	Hydrochloric acid (HCl) + nitric acid (HNO_{3}) + water (H_{2}O) (1:0.1:1) at 40 °C	
Chromium (Cr)	"Chrome etch": ceric ammonium nitrate ((NH_{4})_{2}Ce(NO_{3})_{6}) + nitric acid (HNO_{3}); Hydrochloric acid (HCl)	
Gallium Arsenide (GaAs)	Citric Acid diluted (C_{6}H_{8}O_{7} : H_{2}O, 1 : 1 ) + Hydrogen Peroxide (H_{2}O_{2})+ Water (H_{2}O)	Cl_{2}, CCl_{4}, SiCl_{4}, BCl_{3}, CCl_{2}F_{2}
Gold (Au)	Aqua regia; Iodine solution	
Molybdenum (Mo)		CF_{4}
Organic residues and photoresist	Piranha etch: sulfuric acid (H_{2}SO_{4}) + hydrogen peroxide (H_{2}O_{2})	O_{2} (ashing)
Platinum (Pt)	Aqua regia	
Silicon (Si)	Nitric acid (HNO_{3}) + hydrofluoric acid (HF); Potassium hydroxide (KOH); Ethylenediamine pyrocatechol (EDP); Tetramethylammonium hydroxide (TMAH)	CF_{4}, SF_{6}, NF_{3}; Cl_{2}, CCl_{2}F_{2}
Silicon dioxide (SiO_{2})	Hydrofluoric acid (HF); Buffered oxide etch [BOE]: ammonium fluoride (NH_{4}F) and hydrofluoric acid (HF)	CF_{4}, SF_{6}, NF_{3}
Silicon nitride (Si_{3}N_{4})	85% Phosphoric acid (H_{3}PO_{4}) at 180 °C (Requires SiO_{2} etch mask)	CF_{4}, SF_{6}, NF_{3}, CHF_{3}
Tantalum (Ta)		CF_{4}
Titanium (Ti)	Hydrofluoric acid (HF)	BCl_{3}
Titanium nitride (TiN)	Nitric acid (HNO_{3}) + hydrofluoric acid (HF); SC1; Buffered HF (BOE)	
Tungsten (W)	Nitric acid (HNO_{3}) + hydrofluoric acid (HF); Hydrogen Peroxide (H_{2}O_{2})	CF_{4}; SF_{6}

== See also ==
- Chemical-Mechanical Polishing
- Ingot sawing
- Metal assisted chemical etching
- Lift-off (microtechnology)
- List of semiconductor occupations
