= Ammonium fluoride =

The ammonium cation
The fluoride anion
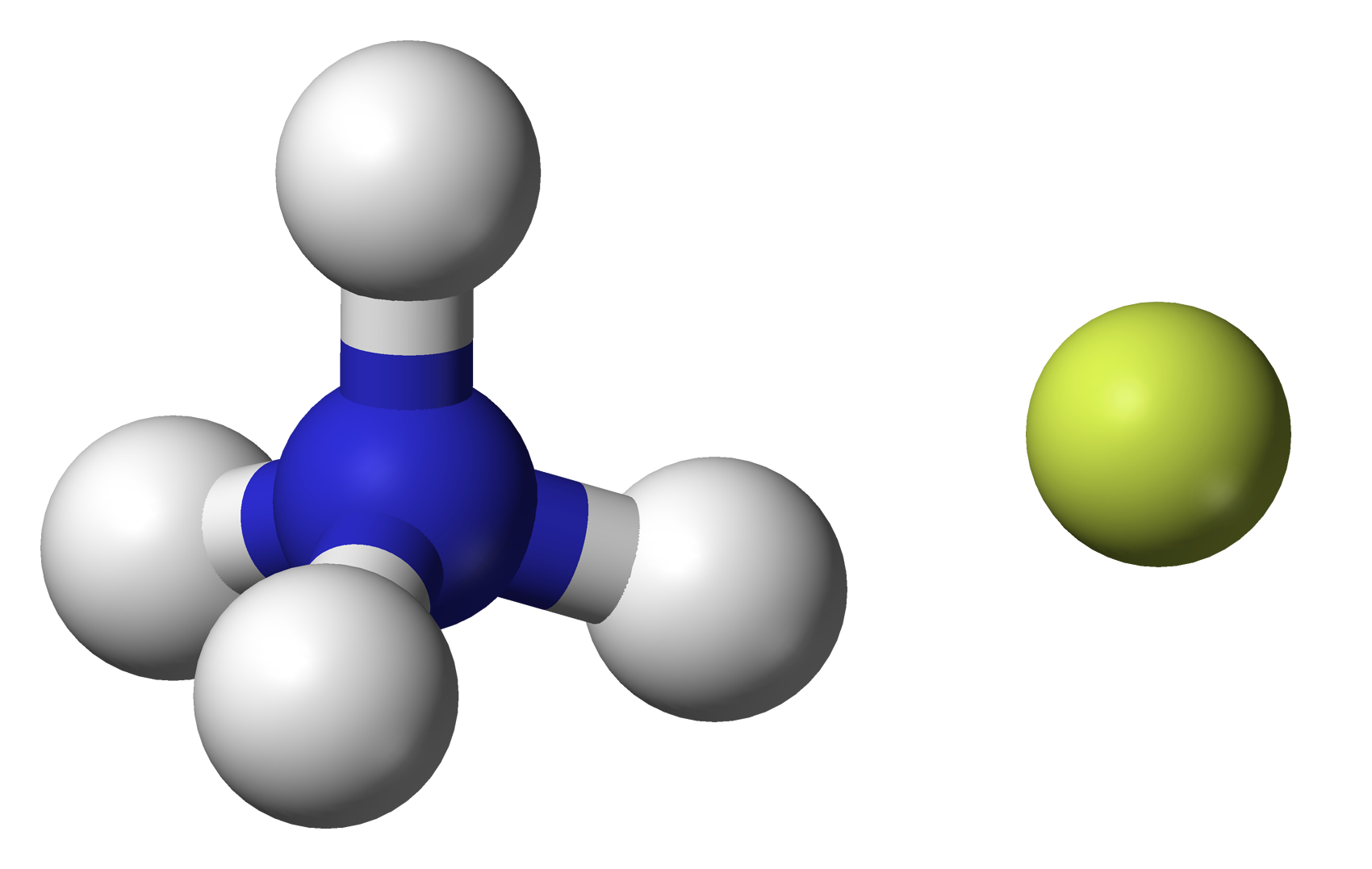
- ball-and-stick model of an ammonium cation (left) and a fluoride anion (right)

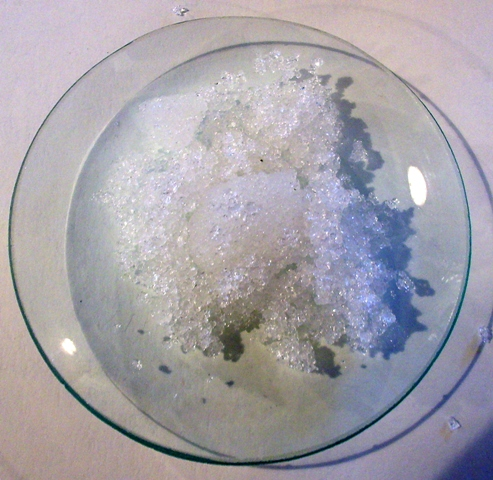
- Solid sample of ammonium fluoride

Names
- IUPAC name Ammonium fluoride
- Other names Neutral ammonium fluoride

Identifiers
CAS Number	12125-01-8
3D model (JSmol)	Interactive image
ChEBI	CHEBI:66871
ChemSpider	23806
ECHA InfoCard	100.031.975
EC Number	235-185-9
PubChem CID	25516
RTECS number	BQ6300000
UNII	4QT928IM0A
UN number	2505
CompTox Dashboard (EPA)	DTXSID6050463
- InChI: InChI=1S/FH.H3N/h1H;1H3 Key: LDDQLRUQCUTJBB-UHFFFAOYSA-N; InChI=1/FH.H3N/h1H;1H3 Key: LDDQLRUQCUTJBB-UHFFFAOYAM
- SMILES: [F-].[NH4+]

Properties
Chemical formula	NH_{4}F
Molar mass	37.037 g/mol
Appearance	White crystalline solid hygroscopic
Density	1.009 g/cm^{3}
Melting point	100 °C (212 °F; 373 K) (decomposes)
Solubility in water	83.5 g/100 ml (25 °C)
Solubility	slightly soluble in alcohol, insoluble in liquid ammonia
Magnetic susceptibility (χ)	−23.0×10^{−6} cm^{3}/mol

Structure
Crystal structure	Wurtzite structure (hexagonal)

Hazards
- GHS labelling
Pictograms	(GHS05: Corrosive) (GHS06: Toxic)
Signal word	Danger
Hazard statements	H301, H311, H314, H330, H331
Precautionary statements	P260, P264, P270, P271, P280, P284, P301+P310, P301+P330+P331, P302+P352, P303+P361+P353, P304+P340, P305+P351+P338, P310, P311, P312, P320, P321, P330, P361, P363, P403+P233, P405, P501
NFPA 704 (fire diamond)	3 0 0
Flash point	Non-flammable
Safety data sheet (SDS)	ICSC 1223

Related compounds
Other anions	Ammonium chloride Ammonium bromide Ammonium iodide
Other cations	Sodium fluoride Potassium fluoride
Related compounds	Ammonium bifluoride
- Except where otherwise noted, data are given for materials in their standard state (at 25 °C [77 °F], 100 kPa). verify (what is ?) Infobox references

Ammonium fluoride is the inorganic compound with the formula NH_{4}F. It crystallizes as small colourless prisms, having a sharp saline taste, and is highly soluble in water. Like all fluoride salts, it is moderately toxic in both acute and chronic overdose.

== Structure ==
Ammonium fluoride adopts the wurtzite crystal structure, in which both the ammonium cations and the fluoride anions are stacked in ABABAB... layers, each being tetrahedrally surrounded by four of the other. There are N−H···F hydrogen bonds between the cations and anions. This structure is very similar to ice, and ammonium fluoride is the only substance which can form mixed crystals with water.

In terms of liquid and gaseous forms, ammonium fluoride sublimes when heated—a property common among ammonium salts. In the sublimation, the salt decomposes to ammonia and hydrogen fluoride; the two gases can still recombine, i.e. the reaction is reversible:

[NH_{4}]F ⇌ NH_{3} + HF

At elevated pressures, ammonium fluoride melts near 230 °C.

== Reactions ==
On passing hydrogen fluoride gas (in excess) through the salt, ammonium fluoride absorbs the gas to form the addition compound ammonium bifluoride. The reaction occurring is:

NH_{4}F + HF → NH_{4}HF_{2}

== Uses ==
This substance is commonly called "commercial ammonium fluoride". The word "neutral" is sometimes added to "ammonium fluoride" to represent the neutral salt [NH_{4}]F as opposed to the "acid salt" (NH_{4}HF_{2}). The acid salt is usually used in preference to the neutral salt in the etching of glass and related silicates. This property is shared among all soluble fluorides. For this reason it cannot be handled in glass test tubes or apparatus during laboratory work.

Ammonium fluoride is a critical component of buffered oxide etch (BOE), a wet etchant used in microfabrication. It acts as the buffering agent in a solution of concentrated HF, creating an etchant with a more controllable rate of etching (than that of simple concentrated HF solutions).

It is also used for preserving wood, as a mothproofing agent, in printing and dyeing textiles, and as an antiseptic in breweries.

== Polymorphism under non-standard conditions ==
Ammonium fluoride (NH_{4}F) exists in several crystalline phases depending on temperature and pressure. At ambient conditions, its structure is very similar to that of ice, unlike the other ammonium halides (NH_{4}Cl, NH_{4}Br, NH_{4}I), which adopt CsCl-type or NaCl-type structures. Under high pressure, NH_{4}F increasingly resembles the other ammonium halides. It adopts a cubic CsCl-type phase (phase III), followed at very high pressure by a tetragonal phase (phase VIII), analogous to phases seen in the other halides at much lower pressures. The transition to phase VIII occurs around 115 GPa in NH_{4}F, roughly an order of magnitude higher than in NH_{4}Cl, NH_{4}Br, or NH_{4}I. An intermediate tetragonal phase (phase IIIt) appears above about 40 GPa as a precursor to phase VIII.
