= Pfeiffer Vacuum =

German compagny

Pfeiffer Vacuum Technology AG
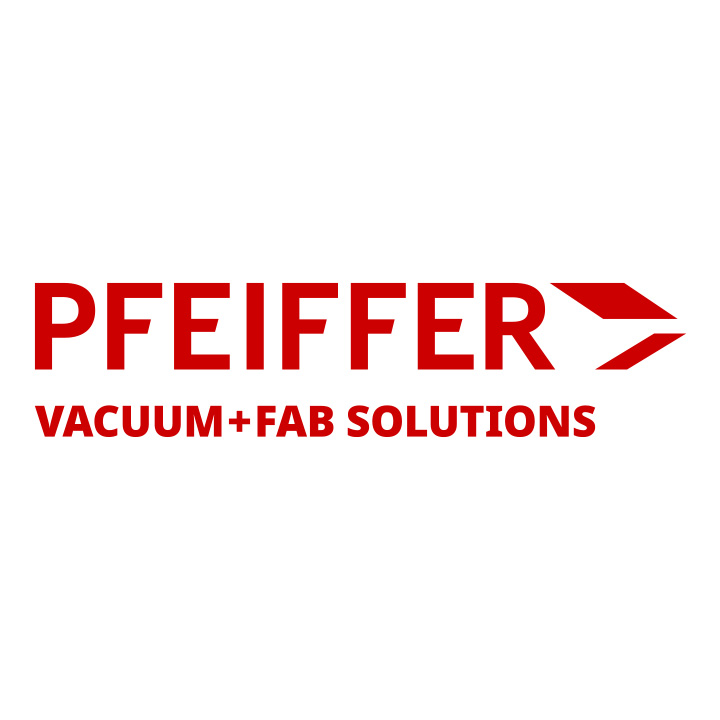
- Type: Public (Aktiengesellschaft)
- Traded as: FWB: PFV
- ISIN: DE0006916604
- Industry: Manufacturing, technology
- Founded: Wetzlar, Germany (1890)
- Founder: Arthur Pfeiffer
- Headquarters: Aßlar, Germany
- Products: Vacuum pumps, measurement and components
- Parent: Busch Group
- Website: www.pfeiffer-vacuum.com

Pfeiffer Vacuum Technology AG is a German manufacturer of vacuum pumps. It is headquartered in Aßlar in Germany with 70% of the total production catering to the export market.

Pfeiffer Vacuum products at Bengaluru Space Expo 2026, BIEC

In July 1996 the company was listed on the NYSE and in April 1998 on the TecDAX. Due to low trading volumes, it was de-listed from the NYSE in October 2007.

Since January 2011 Adixen Vacuum Products (formerly owned by Alcatel-Lucent) is part of Pfeiffer Vacuum GmbH.

== Highlights ==
Export Ratio: approx. 70% (estimated), Stock Exchange Listings: Deutsche Börse, Prime Standard/TecDAX, Accounting: IFRS, Capital Stock: €25,261 thousand, Cash and Cash Equivalents: €108,293 thousand, Equity Ratio: 59%, Net Sales: €519,509 thousand, Operating Profit: €61,777 thousand,

== Shareholder structure ==
Estimated regional split of the Pfeiffer Vacuum Shareholder Structure: 40% in Europe, 30% in the USA, 25% in Germany (thereof about 5 pp are held by Management and private Investors), 5% in Asia.
