= Buffered oxide etch =

Solution used in microfabrication

Buffered oxide etch (BOE), also known as buffered HF or BHF, is a wet etchant used in microfabrication. It is a mixture of a buffering agent, such as ammonium fluoride NH_{4}F, and hydrofluoric acid (HF). Its primary use is in etching thin films of silicon nitride (Si_{3}N_{4}) or silicon dioxide (SiO_{2}), by the reaction:

SiO_{2} + 4HF + 2NH_{4}F → (NH_{4})_{2}SiF_{6} + 2H_{2}O

Concentrated HF (typically 49% HF in water) etches silicon dioxide too quickly for good process control and also peels photoresist used in photolithographic patterning. Buffered oxide etch is commonly used for more controllable etching. Buffering HF with NH_{4}F results in a solution with a more stable pH; thus, more stable concentrations of HF and HF^{−}_{2}, and a more stable etch rate.

Some oxides produce insoluble products in HF solutions. Thus, HCl may be added to BHF solutions in order to dissolve these insoluble products and produce a higher quality etch.

== Production ==
Buffered oxide etch can be produced in laboratory quantities by dissolving NH_{4}F powder into water, and adding a solution of HF.

== Uses ==
A buffered oxide etch solution of 6:1 volume ratio of 40% NH_{4}F to 49% HF will etch thermally grown oxide at approximately 2 nanometres per second at 25 degrees Celsius. Temperature can be increased to raise the etching rate. Continuous stirring of the solution during the etching process helps to have a more homogeneous solution, which may etch more uniformly by removing etched material from the surface.

Buffered oxide etch can be used in the metallographic etching of titanium alloys. Newer Ti-alloys (such as Ti-Cu and Ti-Mo) are not etched as reliably by typical Ti-etching reagents, but can be etched by BOE and ammonium bifluoride.

HF solution buffered with NH_{4}F can be used to provide better etching of zeolite for the creation of larger pores, to improve the characteristically poor rate of diffusion in these microporous structures. Simple HF solutions (and other acidic methods of etching) show high selectivity in removing aluminum from zeolites, reducing the number of potential Brønsted acid sites, and subsequently reducing certain catalytic performance. However, the addition of a NH_{4}F buffer results in a solution with more HF and HF^{−}_{2} present, which removes Al and Si in more equal proportion.
