= Thermochemical nanolithography =

Thermochemical nanolithography (TCNL) or thermochemical scanning probe lithography (tc-SPL) is a scanning probe microscopy-based nanolithography technique which triggers thermally activated chemical reactions to change the chemical functionality or the phase of surfaces. Chemical changes can be written very quickly through rapid probe scanning, since no mass is transferred from the tip to the surface, and writing speed is limited only by the heat transfer rate. TCNL was invented in 2007 by a group at the Georgia Institute of Technology. Riedo and collaborators demonstrated that TCNL can produce local chemical changes with feature sizes down to 12 nm at scan speeds up to 1 mm/s.

TCNL was used in 2013 to create a nano-scale replica of the Mona Lisa "painted" with different probe tip temperatures. Called the Mini Lisa, the portrait measured 30 micrometres (0.0012 in), about 1/25,000th the size of the original.

== Technique ==
The AFM thermal cantilevers are generally made from a silicon wafers using traditional bulk and surface micro-machining processes. Through the application of an electric current through its highly doped silicon wings, resistive heating occurs at the light doping zone around the probe tip, where the largest fraction of the heat is dissipated. The tip is able to change its temperature very quickly due to its small volume; an average tip in contact with polycarbonate has a time constant of 0.35 ms. The tips can be cycled between ambient temperature and 1100 °C at up to 10 MHz while the distance of the tip from the surface and the tip temperature can be controlled independently.

== Applications ==
Thermally activated reactions have been triggered in proteins, organic semiconductors, electroluminescent conjugated polymers, and nanoribbon resistors. Deprotection of functional groups (sometimes involving a temperature gradients), and the reduction of graphene oxide has been demonstrated. The wettability of a polymer surface at the nanoscale has been modified, and nanostructures of poly(p-phenylene vinylene) (an electroluminescence conjugated polymer) have been created. Nanoscale templates on polymer films for the assembly of nano-objects such as proteins and DNA have also been created and crystallization of ferroelectric ceramics with storage densities up to 213 Gb/in^{2} have been produced.

The use of a material that can undergo multiple chemical reactions at significantly different temperatures could lead to a multi-state system, wherein different functionalities can be addressed at different temperatures. Synthetic polymers, such as PMCC, have been used as functional layers on substrate, which allow for high-resolution patterning.

== Comparison with other lithographic techniques ==
Thermo-mechanical scanning probe lithography relies on the application of heat and force order to create indentations for patterning purposes (see also: Millipede memory). Thermal scanning probe lithography (t-SPL) specializes on removing material from a substrate without the intent of chemically altering the created topography. Local oxidation nanolithography relies on oxidation reactions in a water meniscus around the probe tip.

== See also ==
- Atomic force microscopy
- Dip-pen nanolithography
- Local oxidation nanolithography
- Nanolithography
- Nanotechnology
- Scanning probe lithography
- Scanning probe microscopy
