= Medical device design =

Product design regulations

Due to the many regulations in the industry, the design of medical devices presents significant challenges from both engineering and legal perspectives.

== Medical device design in the United States ==
The United States medical device industry is one of the largest markets globally, exceeding $110 billion annually. In 2012 it represented 38% of the global market and more than 6500 medical device companies exist nationwide. These companies are primarily small-scale operations with fewer than 50 employees. The most medical device companies are in the states of California, Florida, New York, Pennsylvania, Michigan, Massachusetts, Illinois, Minnesota, and Georgia. Washington, Wisconsin, and Texas also have high employment levels in the medical device industry. The industry is divided into branches: Electro-Medical Equipment, Irradiation Apparatuses, Surgical and Medical Instruments, Surgical Appliances and Supplies, and Dental Equipment and Supplies.

== FDA regulation and oversight ==
Medical devices are defined by the US Food and Drug Administration (FDA) as any object or component used in diagnosis, treatment, prevention, or cure of medical conditions or diseases, or affects body structure or function through means other than chemical or metabolic reaction in humans or animals. This includes all medical tools, excluding drugs, ranging from tongue depressors to Computerized Axial Tomography (CAT) scanners to radiology treatments. Because of the wide variety of equipment classified as medical devices, the FDA has no single standard to which a specific device must be manufactured; instead they have created an encompassing guide that all manufacturers must follow. Manufacturers are required to develop comprehensive procedures within the FDA framework in order to produce a specific device to approved safety standards.

=== Pathway to clearance or approval ===
The US FDA allows for three regulatory pathways that allow the marketing of medical devices. The first is self-registration. The second, and by far the most common is the so-called 510(k) clearance process (named after the Food, Drug, and Cosmetic Act section that describes the process). A new medical device that can be demonstrated to be "substantially equivalent" to a previously legally marketed device can be "cleared" by the FDA for marketing as long as the general and special controls as described below are met. The vast majority of new medical devices (99%) enter the marketplace via this process. The 510(k) pathway rarely requires clinical trials.

The third regulatory pathway for new medical devices is the Premarket Approval process (PMA), described below, which is similar to the pathway for a new drug approval. Typically, clinical trials are required for this premarket approval pathway.

The FDA process between drugs and devices is different, with most devices requiring clearance for the market launch, not approval. Approval is required for the PMA process of Class III devices.

==== Timeline ====
In comparison to a device, a drug takes up to nine years longer to reach the market. It can take drugs up to twelve years to be granted FDA approval. In general, for class I, II and III devices, from the design process until the final FDA market clearance, it can take anywhere from three to seven years.

==== Requirements for testing ====
Class I

Class I are low risk of illness or injury devices. Around seventy-five percent of Class I devices, and a small number of class II devices qualify for exempt status. This means there is no requirement for safety data.

Class II

Class II are devices with moderate risk. Class I and Class II devices are subject to less stringent regulatory processes than Class III devices. Class I or II devices are focused on registration, manufacturing, and labeling. In general they do not require clinical data. Most class II devices go through a pre-market notification (PMN) process (a 510[k] clearance). The PMN will not require stringent clinical trial evidence.

Class III

Class III are devices which support or sustain human life, are of substantial importance in preventing impairment of human health, or present a potential, unreasonable risk of illness or injury.

All new devices by default are placed in the class III category. The FDA then requires these devices to undergo stringent clinical reviews. For these reviews, the FDA require some type of clinical evidence or trials. If the sponsor believes the device is low to moderate risk, the sponsor may apply to change this default classification. The FDA, upon review may then reclassify these devices as de novo. De novo devices require a less rigorous FDA regulatory process and the FDA treats de novo devices like class I and II devices.

Class III devices with predicates

Class III devices with predicates (devices with a substantially equivalent device already on the market) are reclassified as class I or II devices. This is done through a 513(g) pathway. Class III devices reclassified as a class I or II, are then subject to less stringent testing requirements. As reclassified class II devices they would require a PMN (510[k]) process, not the PMA process.

=== Regulatory Controls ===
==== General Controls ====
General controls include provisions that relate to:

- adulteration
- misbranding
- device registration and listing
- premarket notification
- banned devices
- notification, including repair, replacement, or refund
- records and reports
- restricted devices
- good manufacturing practices

==== Special Controls ====
Special controls were established for cases in which patient safety and product effectiveness are not fully guaranteed by general controls. Special controls may include special labeling requirements, mandatory performance standards and postmarket surveillance. Special controls are specific to each device and classification guides are available for various branches of medical devices.

==== Premarket Approval ====
Premarket Approval is a scientific review to ensure the device's safety and effectiveness, in addition to the general controls of Class I.

=== Risk Classification ===
Under the Food, Drug, and Cosmetic Act, the U.S. Food and Drug Administration recognizes three classes of medical devices, based on the level of control necessary to assure safety and effectiveness. The classification procedures are described in the Code of Federal Regulations, Title 21, part 860 (usually known as 21 CFR 860). Devices are classified into three brackets:

- Class I: General Controls
- Class II: General Controls and Special Controls
- Class III: General Controls and Premarket Approval

Regulations differ by class based on their complexity or the potential hazards in the event of malfunction. Class I devices are the least likely to cause major bodily harm or death in the event of failure, and are subjected to less stringent regulations than devices categorized as Class II or Class III.

In the regulation process, 2021 statistics showed: 47% of devices were class I, 43% were class II and 10% were class III.

==== Class I: General controls ====
Class I devices are subject to the least regulatory control. Class I devices are subject to "General Controls" as are Class II and Class III devices.

General controls are the only controls regulating Class I medical devices. They state that Class I devices are not intended to be:

1. For use in supporting or sustaining life;
2. Of substantial importance in preventing impairment to human life or health; and
3. May not present an unreasonable risk of illness or injury.

Most Class I devices are exempt from premarket notification and a few are also exempted from most good manufacturing practices regulations.

Examples of Class I devices include hand-held surgical instruments, (elastic) bandages, examination gloves, bed-patient monitoring systems, medical disposable bedding, and some prosthetics such as hearing aids.

==== Class II: General controls and special controls ====
Class II devices are those for which general controls alone cannot assure safety and effectiveness, and existing methods are available that provide such assurances. Devices in Class II are held to a higher level of assurance and subject to stricter regulatory requirements than Class I devices, and are designed to perform as indicated without causing injury or harm to patient or user. In addition to complying with general controls, Class II devices are also subject to special controls.

Examples of Class II devices include acupuncture needles, powered wheelchairs, infusion pumps, air purifiers, and surgical drapes.

A few Class II devices are exempt from the premarket notification.

==== Class III: General controls and premarket approval ====
A Class III device is one for which insufficient information exists to assure safety and effectiveness solely through the general or special controls sufficient for Class I or Class II devices. These devices are considered high-risk and are usually those that support or sustain human life, are of substantial importance in preventing impairment of human health, pose a potential, unreasonable risk of injury or illness, or are of great significance in preventative care. For these reasons, Class III devices require premarket approval.

Prior to marketing a Class III device, the rights-holder(s) or person(s) with authorized access must seek FDA approval. The review process may exceed six months for final determination of safety by an FDA advisory committee. Many Class III devices have established guidelines for Premarket Approval (PMA) and increasingly, must comply with unique device identifier regulations. However, with ongoing technological advances many Class III devices encompass concepts not previously marketed. These devices may not fit the scope of established device categories and do not yet have developed FDA guidelines.

Examples of Class III devices that require premarket approval include implantable pacemaker, pulse generators, HIV diagnostic tests, automated external defibrillators, and endosseous implants.

== Nanomanufacturing ==
Nanomanufacturing techniques provide a means of manufacturing cellular-scale medical devices (<100μm). They are particularly useful in the context of medical research, where cellular-scale sensors can be produced that provide high-resolution measurements of cellular-scale phenomena. Common techniques in the area are direct-write nanopatterning techniques such as dip-pen nanolithography, electron-beam photolithography and microcontact printing, directed self-assembly methods, and Functional Nanoparticle Delivery (NFP), where nanofountain probes deliver liquid molecular material that is drawn through nanopattern channels by capillary action.

== Additive manufacturing ==
Additive manufacturing (AM) processes are a dominant mode of production for medical devices that are used inside the body, such as implants, transplants and prostheses, for their ability to replicate organic shapes and enclosed volumes that are difficult to fabricate. The inability of donation systems to meet the demand for organ transplantation in particular has led to the rise of AM in medical device manufacturing.

=== Biocompatibility ===
The largest issue in integrating AM techniques into medical device manufacturing is biocompatibility. These issues arise from the stability of 3D printed polymers in the body and the difficulty of sterilizing regions between printed layers. In addition to the use of primary cleaners and solvents to remove surface impurities, which are commonly isopropyl alcohol, peroxides, and bleach, secondary solvents must be used in succession to remove the cleaning chemicals applied before them, a problem that increases with the porosity of the material used. Common compatibility AM materials include nylon and tissue material from the host patient.

== Cybersecurity ==
Many medical devices have either been successfully attacked or had potentially deadly vulnerabilities demonstrated, including both in-hospital diagnostic equipment and implanted devices including pacemakers and insulin pumps. On 28 December 2016 the US Food and Drug Administration released its recommendations that are not legally enforceable for how medical device manufacturers should maintain the security of Internet-connected devices.
