= Multilayer soft lithography =

Multilayer soft lithography (MSL) is a fabrication process in which microscopic chambers, channels, valves and vias are molded within bonded layers of elastomer.

Commercial PDMS stamps can mold materials such as optical adhesive in a sequential process to create the bonded layers.

== See also ==
- Soft lithography
