= PMCC (disambiguation) =

The PMCC, or product moment correlation coefficient, is a statistical measure of correlation.

PMCC may also refer to:

- Peter Munk Cardiac Centre, heart centre in Toronto
- Princess Margaret Cancer Centre, research centre in Toronto
- PMCC polymer, a synthetic polymer
- Pentecostal Missionary Church of Christ (4th Watch), a Philippine church denomination
