= HSQ =

HSQ may refer to:

- Hampton String Quartet
- Hollywood String Quartet
- Hydrogen silsesquioxane
