= Nanofountain probe =

Device for drawing nanoscale patterns

A nanofountain probe (NFP) is a device for 'drawing' micropatterns of liquid chemicals at extremely small resolution. An NFP contains a cantilevered micro-fluidic device terminated in a nanofountain. The embedded microfluidics facilitates rapid and continuous delivery of molecules from the on-chip reservoirs to the fountain tip. When the tip is brought into contact with the substrate, a liquid meniscus forms, providing a path for molecular transport to the substrate. By controlling the geometry of the meniscus through hold time and deposition speed, various inks and biomolecules could be patterned on a surface, with sub 100 nm resolution.

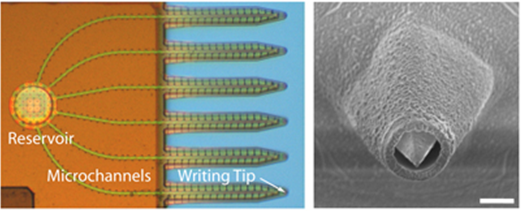
Optical image of an array (left) and SEM image of the tip (right)

== Historical background ==
The advent of dip-pen nanolithography (DPN) in recent years represented a revolution in nanoscale patterning technology. With sub-100-nanometer resolution and an architecture conducive to massive parallelization, DPN is capable of producing large arrays of nanoscale features. As such, conventional DPN and other probe-based techniques are generally limited in their rate of deposition and by the need for repeated re-inking during extended patterning.

To address these challenges, nanofountain probe was developed by Espinosa et al. where microchannels were embedded in AFM probes to transport ink or bio-molecules from reservoirs to substrates, realizing continuous writing at the nanoscale. Integration of continuous liquid ink feeding within the NFP facilitates more rapid deposition and eliminates the need for repeated dipping, all while preserving the sub-100-nanometer resolution of DPN.

== Microfabrication ==
Nano fountain probes (NFPs) are fabricated on the wafer-scale using microfabrication techniques allowing for batch fabrication of numerous chips. Through the different generations of devices, design and experimentation improved the device yielding to a robust fabrication process. The highly enhanced feature dimension and shapes is expected to improve the performance in writing and imaging.

Microfabrication sequence

== Applications ==
=== Direct-write nanopatterning ===
NFP is used in the development of a to scale, direct-write nanomanufacturing platform. The platform is capable of constructing complex, highly-functional nanoscale devices from a diverse suite of materials (e.g., nanoparticles, catalysts (increase rate of reaction), biomolecules, and chemical solutions). Demonstrated nanopatterning capabilities include:

• Biomolecules (proteins, DNA) for biodetection assays or cell adhesion studies

• Functional nanoparticles for drug delivery studies and nanosystems making (fabrication)

• Catalysts for carbon nanotube growth in nanodevice fabrication

• Thiols for directed self-assembly of nanostructures.

=== Direct in-vitro single-cell injection ===
Taking advantage of the unique tip geometry of the NFP nanomaterials are directly injected into live cells with minimal invasiveness. This enables unique studies of nanoparticle-mediated delivery, as well as cellular pathways and toxicity. Whereas typical in vitro studies are limited to cell populations, these broadly-applicable tools enable multifaceted interrogation at a truly single cell level.

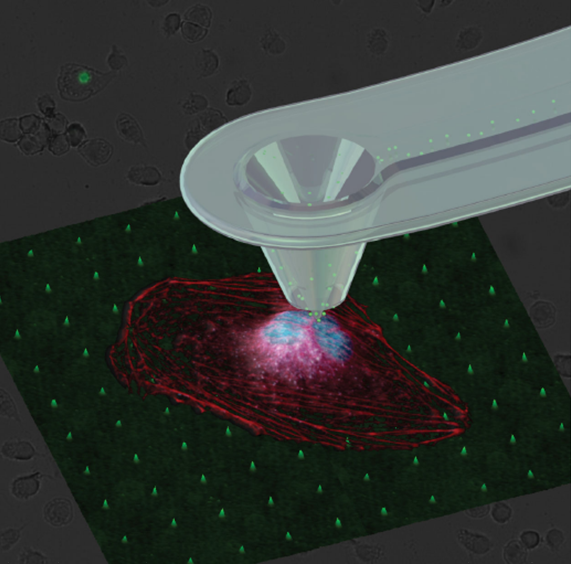
In vitro single cell injection using NFP

== See also ==
- Nanolithography
