= Elisa Riedo =

- Born: Como, Italy
- Education: Universita' degli Studi di Milano
- Known for: thermal scanning probe lithography (tSPL), nanofabrication, nanomechanics, epitaxial graphene, diamene
- Scientific career
- Fields: Nanotechnology, Physics, Materials, Nanofabrication
- Workplaces: Georgia Tech, New York University https://engineering.nyu.edu
- Website: https://engineering.nyu.edu/faculty/elisa-riedo

Elisa Riedo is a physicist and researcher known for her contributions in condensed matter physics, nanotechnology and engineering. She is the Herman F. Mark Chair Professor of Chemical and Biomolecular Engineering at the New York University Tandon School of Engineering and the director of the picoForce Lab.

== Academic career ==
Professor Elisa Riedo received her B.S. in physics Summa cum Laude from the University of Milano, Italy, in 1995.She received her Ph.D. in physics in a joint program between the University of Milano and the European Synchrotron Radiation Facility in Grenoble, France in 2000. She worked is some of the major research centers in Europe, including ESRF, CERN (Switzerland), CoreCom (Politecnico of Milan and Pirelli) (Italy), Forshungzentrum of Jülich (Germany), and TASC – INFM labs, Trieste (Italy). She then worked at the École Polytechnique Fédérale de Lausanne (EPFL) as post doctoral fellow. In 2003 she was hired as assistant professor at the Georgia Institute of Technology in the School of Physics, where she was promoted to associate professor with tenure in 2009 and to full professor in 2015. From 2016 to summer 2018, she worked as Nanoscience Professor at the CUNY Advanced Science Research Center (ASRC), as well as a physics professor at the City College of New York. Since 2018, she is a professor at the NYU Tandon School of Engineering in the department of Chemical and Biomolecular Engineering, where she is the director of the picoForce Lab.

== Research ==
Her research is focused on understanding materials and physical processes at the nanoscale. Her lab is focused on developing new scanning probe microscopy based methods to study and fabricate materials and solid/liquid interfaces at the nanoscale. Highlights from her research are the invention of thermochemical nanolithography, the discovery of the exotic viscoelasticity of water at the interface with a solid surface, and the development of new methods to study materials' elasticity and friction with sub-nm resolution. Thermochemical nanolithography, TCNL, also called thermochemical scanning probe lithography (tcSPL) or thermal scanning probe lithography (tSPL) was invented in Riedo's laboratory at Georgia Tech in 2007 [32, 4] and further developed at IBM. tSPL uses a localized source of heat to activate chemical reactions at the nano-down-to the atomic scale. tSPL has a variety of applications in biology, nanomedicine, nanoelectronics, and nanophotonics.

Riedo's research is also well-known for its contributions in nanomechanics, in particular for the development of novel atomic force microscopy methods to study the elastic properties of nanomaterials (modulated nanoindentation(MoNI) and A-indentation), and the first observation of the exceptional mechanical properties of diamene, single layer diamond, obtained from pressurizing epitaxial two-layer graphene.

In 2013, Riedo was elected Fellow of the American Physical Society for her atomic force microscopy studies of nanoscale friction, liquid structure and nanotube elasticity, and the invention of thermochemical nanolithography.

== Honors and awards ==
- 2017: The CNST NIST Director's office Lecture (September 2017)
- 2013: American Physical Society Elected Fellow, for "For atomic force microscopy studies of nanoscale friction, liquid structure and nanotube elasticity, and the invention of thermochemical nanolithography".
- 2006: GT Cutting Edge Research Award
- 2005: Selected Highly Creative Researcher in Nanoscience and Nanotechnology for the "Project on Creativity Capabilities and the Promotion of Highly Innovative Research" (CREA), a joint USA/European endeavor.
- 1995: Physics Degree Summa cum Laude.
