= Mini Lisa =

2013 microscopic replica of the Mona Lisa

Mini Lisa compared to its inspiration, Mona Lisa

The Mini Lisa is a nanoscale replica of the Mona Lisa. It was created in 2013 by Keith Carroll, a Georgia Institute of Technology PhD candidate, in order to demonstrate a technique called thermochemical nanolithography (TCNL) that was invented at the university. In TCNL, a tiny cantilever viewed through an atomic force microscope uses heat to activate a series of chemical reactions that create new molecules. Greater amounts of heat create more molecules which lighten the surface of the substrate, allowing a grayscale image to be created.

The Mini Lisa is just 30 micrometres (0.0012 in) wide, about a third the width of a human hair. It is roughly 1/25,000th the size of the Mona Lisa. The Mini Lisa was created by making hundreds of individual points each 125 nanometres (4.9×10^{−6} in) wide. Carroll decided to recreate the Mona Lisa after a challenger claimed TCNL was not precise enough to create a work of art. He created an automated process to create any image desired based on a supplied heat map.

The Mini Lisa project, which also included recreations of photographs by Ansel Adams, was published in Langmuir in August 2013. The paper's lead author, physicist Jennifer Curtis, said the experiment demonstrated for the first time that it was possible not only to manipulate molecules on a nano-scale, but also precisely control how many are there. She said that TCNL "should enable a wide range of previously inaccessible experiments" in a diverse set of fields as it evolves. The project also received mention in the popular press.
