= Millipede memory =

Novel type of computer memory

Millipede memory is a form of non-volatile computer memory. It promised a data density of more than 1 terabit per square inch (1 gigabit per square millimeter), which is about the limit of the perpendicular recording hard drives. Millipede storage technology was pursued as a potential replacement for magnetic recording in hard drives and a means of reducing the physical size of the technology to that of flash media.

IBM demonstrated a prototype millipede storage device at CeBIT 2005 and was trying to make the technology commercially available by the end of 2007. However, because of concurrent advances in competing storage technologies, no commercial product has been made available since then.

== Technology ==
=== Basic concept ===
The main memory of modern computers is constructed from one of a number of DRAM-related devices. DRAM basically consists of a series of capacitors, which store data in terms of the presence or absence of electrical charge. Each capacitor and its associated control circuitry, referred to as a cell, holds one bit, and multiple bits can be read or written in large blocks at the same time. DRAM is volatile — data is lost when power is removed.

In contrast, hard drives store data on a disk that is covered with a magnetic material; data is represented by this material being locally magnetized. Reading and writing are accomplished by a single head, which waits for the requested memory location to pass under the head while the disk spins. As a result, a hard drive's performance is limited by the mechanical speed of the motor, and it is generally hundreds of thousands of times slower than DRAM. However, since the "cells" in a hard drive are much smaller, the storage density for hard drives is much higher than DRAM. Hard drives are non-volatile — data is retained even after power is removed.

Millipede storage attempts to combine features of both. Like a hard drive, millipede both stores data in a medium and accesses the data by moving the medium under the head. Also similar to hard drives, millipede's physical medium stores a bit in a small area, leading to high storage densities. However, millipede uses many nanoscopic heads that can read and write in parallel, thereby increasing the amount of data read at a given time.

Mechanically, millipede uses numerous atomic force probes, each of which is responsible for reading and writing a large number of bits associated with it. These bits are stored as a pit, or the absence of one, in the surface of a thermo-active polymer, which is deposited as a thin film on a carrier known as the sled. Any one probe can only read or write a fairly small area of the sled available to it, known as a storage field. Normally the sled is moved so that the selected bits are positioned under the probe using electromechanical actuators. These actuators are similar to those that position the read/write head in a typical hard drive, however, the actual distance moved is tiny in comparison. The sled is moved in a scanning pattern to bring the requested bits under the probe, a process known as x/y scan.

The amount of memory serviced by any one field/probe pair is fairly small, but so is its physical size. Thus, many such field/probe pairs are used to make up a memory device, and data reads and writes can be spread across many fields in parallel, increasing the throughput and improving the access times. For instance, a single 32-bit value would normally be written as a set of single bits sent to 32 different fields. In the initial experimental devices, the probes were mounted in a 32x32 grid for a total of 1,024 probes. Given this layout looked like the legs on a millipede (animal), the name stuck. The design of the cantilever array involves making numerous mechanical cantilevers, on which a probe has to be mounted. All the cantilevers are made entirely out of silicon, using surface micromachining at the wafer surface.

Regarding the creation of indentations, or pits, non-crosslinked polymers retain a low glass temperature, around 120 °C for PMMA and if the probe tip is heated to above the glass temperature, it leaves a small indentation. Indentations are made at 3 nm lateral resolution. By heating the probe immediately next to an indentation, the polymer will re-melt and fill in the indentation, erasing it (see also: thermo-mechanical scanning probe lithography). After writing, the probe tip can be used to read the indentations. If each indentation is treated as one bit then a storage density of 0.9 Tb/in^{2} could theoretically be achieved.

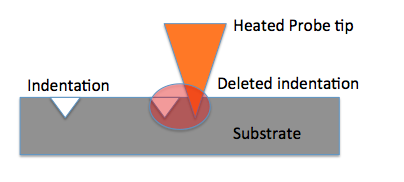
Thermal writing and erasing of a bit

=== Reading and writing data ===
Each probe in the cantilever array stores and reads data thermo-mechanically, handling one bit at a time. To accomplish a read, the probe tip is heated to around 300 °C and moved in proximity to the data sled. If the probe is located over a pit, the cantilever will push it into the hole, increasing the surface area in contact with the sled, and in turn increasing the cooling as heat leaks into the sled from the probe. In the case where there is no pit at that location, only the very tip of the probe remains in contact with the sled, and the heat leaks away more slowly. The electrical resistance of the probe is a function of its temperature, and it rises with an increase in temperature. Thus when the probe drops into a pit and cools, this registers as a drop in resistance. A low resistance will be translated to a "1" bit, or a "0" bit otherwise. While reading an entire storage field, the tip is dragged over the entire surface, and the resistance changes are constantly monitored.

To write a bit, the tip of the probe is heated to a temperature above the glass transition temperature of the polymer used to manufacture the data sled, which is generally made of acrylic glass. In this case the transition temperature is around 400 °C. To write a "1", the polymer in proximity to the tip is softened, and then the tip is gently touched to it, causing a dent. To erase the bit and return it to the zero state, the tip is instead pulled up from the surface, allowing surface tension to pull the surface flat again. Older experimental systems used a variety of erasure techniques that were generally more time-consuming and less successful. These older systems offered around 100,000 erases, but the available references do not contain enough information to say whether this has been improved with the newer techniques.

As one might expect, the need to heat the probes requires a fairly large amount of power for general operation. However, the exact amount is dependent on the speed that data is being accessed; at slower rates, the cooling during read is smaller, as is the number of times the probe has to be heated to a higher temperature to write. When operated at data rates of a few megabits per second, Millipede is expected to consume about 100 milliwatts, which is in the range of flash memory technology and considerably below hard drives. However, one of the main advantages of the Millipede design is that it is highly parallel, allowing it to run at much higher speeds into the GB/s. At these sorts of speeds, one might expect power requirements more closely matching current hard drives, and indeed, data transfer speed is limited to the kilobits-per-second range for an individual probe, which amounts to a few megabits for an entire array. Experiments done at IBM's Almaden Research Center showed that individual tips could support data rates as high as 1–2 megabits per second, potentially offering aggregate speeds in the GB/s range.

=== Applications ===
Millipede memory was proposed as a form of non-volatile computer memory that was intended to compete with flash memory in terms of data storage, reading and writing speed, and physical size of the technology. However, other technologies have since surpassed it, and thus it does not appear to be a technology currently being pursued.

== History ==
=== First devices ===
The earliest generation millipede devices used probes 10 nanometers in diameter and 70 nanometers in length, producing pits about 40 nm in diameter on fields 92 μm × 92 μm. Arranged in a 32 × 32 grid, the resulting 3 mm × 3 mm chip stores 500 megabits of data, or 62.5 MB, resulting in an areal density, the number of bits per square inch, on the order of 200 Gbit/in^{2}. IBM initially demonstrated this device in 2003, planning to introduce it commercially in 2005. By that point hard drives were approaching 150 Gbit/in^{2} and have since surpassed it.

=== Proposed commercial product ===
Devices demonstrated at the CeBIT Expo in 2005 improved on the basic design, using a 64 × 64 cantilever chips with a 7 mm × 7 mm data sled, boosting the data storage capacity to 800 Gbit/in^{2} using smaller pits. It appears the pit size can scale to about 10 nm, resulting in a theoretical areal density just over 1 Tbit/in^{2}. IBM planned to introduce devices based on this sort of density in 2007. For comparison, as of late 2011, laptop hard drives were shipping with a density of 636 Gbit/in^{2}, and it is expected that heat-assisted magnetic recording and patterned media together could support densities of 10 Tbit/in^{2}. Flash reached almost 250 Gbit/in^{2} in early 2010.

=== Current development ===
As of 2015, because of concurrent advances in competing storage technologies, no commercial product has been made available so far.

== See also ==
- Nanoelectromechanical systems
- Nanotechnology
- Nanolithography
- Thermal scanning probe lithography
- Punched card
