= Soft lithography =

Techniques that create structures using stamps

Figure 1 - "Inking" a stamp. PDMS stamp with pattern is placed in Ethanol and ODT (octadecanethiol) solution

Figure 2 - ODT from the solution settles down onto the PDMS stamp. Stamp now has ODT attached to it which acts as the ink.

Figure 3 - The PDMS stamp with the ODT is placed on the gold substrate. When the stamp is removed, the ODT in contact with the gold stays stuck to the gold. Thus the pattern from the stamp is transferred to the gold via the ODT "ink."

In technology, soft lithography is a family of techniques for fabricating or replicating structures using "elastomeric stamps, molds, and conformable photomasks". It is called "soft" because it uses elastomeric materials, most notably PDMS.

PDMS, an amorphous polymer, is favored for the following characteristics:

- Elasticity: the elasticity of PDMS is tuned by (1) adjusting curing conditions (curing agent concentration and temperature) and (2) dispersing particles throughout the polymer matrix. Its elasticity and durability allows the mold to conform to the surface of the substrate without rupture.
- Optical transparency: PDMS transmits ~90% of light from 390 nm to 780 nm, meaning it's optically transparent across the entire visible spectrum. The transparency of PDMS allows the direct observation of biological processes (including the observation of blood flow through the mimicked PDMS-based blood vessels).
- Gas-permeability: PDMS is gas-permeable which is useful in applications such as Microfluidics.
- Isotropic: PDMS is isotropic, meaning its physical properties are identical in every direction, and will thus perform uniformly.
- Chemically-inert: PDMS will not interfere chemically with the substrate.

Following the molding onto the master template, PDMS is cured at high temperatures with a cross-linking agent.

Soft lithography is generally used to construct features measured on the micrometer to nanometer scale. According to Rogers and Nuzzo (2005), development of soft lithography expanded rapidly from 1995 to 2005. Soft lithography tools are now commercially available.

== Types ==
- PDMS stamp
- Microcontact printing
- Multilayer soft lithography
- Nanosphere lithography
- Patterning by etching at the nanoscale

== Advantages ==
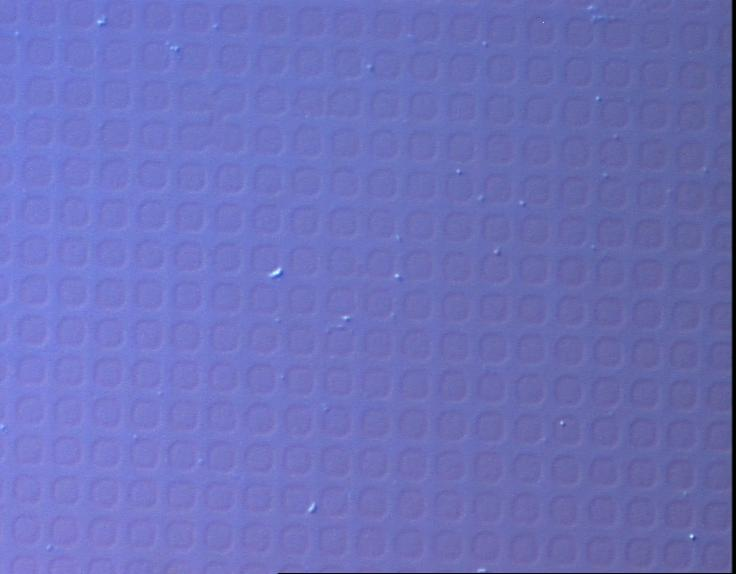
Sarfus image of streptavidin deposited by soft lithography with PDMS stamp.

Soft lithography has some unique advantages over other forms of lithography (such as photolithography and electron beam lithography). They include the following:

- Lower cost than traditional photolithography in mass production
- Well-suited for applications in biotechnology
- Well-suited for applications in plastic electronics
- Well-suited for applications involving large or nonplanar (nonflat) surfaces
- More pattern-transferring methods than traditional lithography techniques (more "ink" options)
- Does not need a photo-reactive surface to create a nanostructure
- Smaller details than photolithography in laboratory settings (~30 nm vs ~100 nm). The resolution depends on the mask used and can reach 6 nm.
- Nanolithography

== Limitations ==
Due to the high elasticity of PDMS (or an alternative elastomer), the stamp can undergo undesired mechanical deformations including pairing, shrinking, and sagging.

- Pairing: the lateral collapse of the elastomer which can happen due to the low structural and high elasticity of the stamp. If the height of the feature is much greater than its width, adjacent structures may collapse.
- Sagging: If the height of the features is much less than the distance, the stamp may sag due to gravity.
- Shrinking: the volume of PDMS shrinks by 1% after curing. Depending on the dimensional tolerance of the design, the registered pattern may produce inaccurate patterns.
