= PMCC polymer =

Synthetic polymer

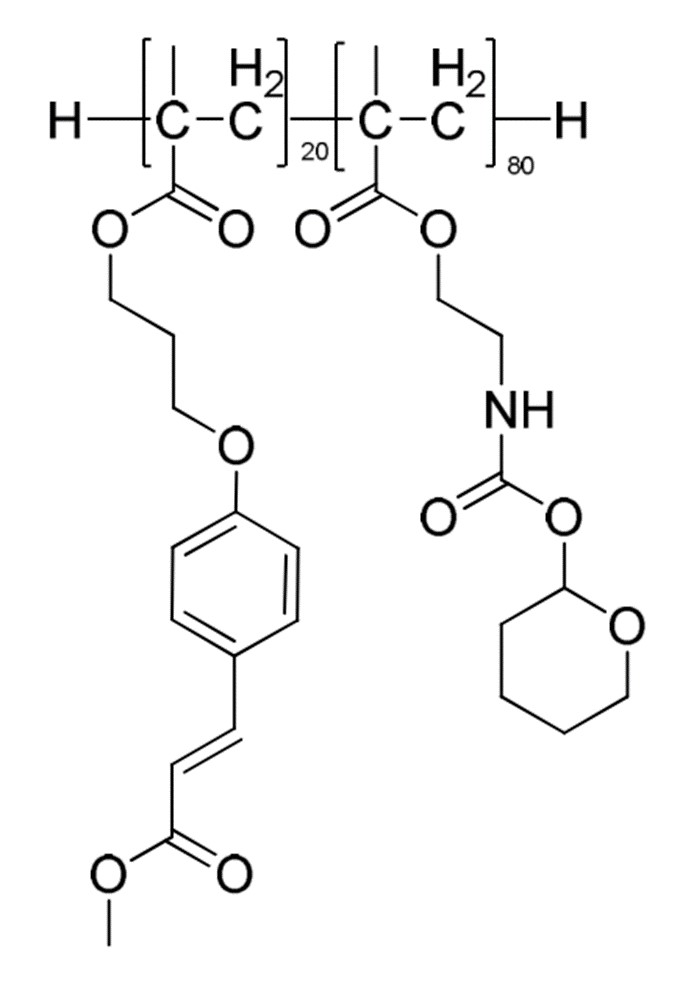
PMCC structure

Poly (tetrahydropyran-2-yl N-(2 methacryloxyethyl) carbamate)-b-(methyl 4-(3-methacryloyloxypropoxy) cinnamate) (PMCC) is a synthetic polymer with thermally active groups, which upon heating, decomposes and exposes primary amines, providing a basis for surface modification. The structure of PMCC is based on a PMMA backbone with different functional groups on its sidechain. It is soluble in cyclohexanone or chloroform and has been used to create bone tissue replicas and to study protein immobilization in biological sciences.

== Structure and synthesis ==
PMCC is a cinnamate-carbamate copolymer synthesized by a mixture of methacrylate monomers, a cinnamate monomer ("A", methyl 4-(3-methacryloyloxypropoxy) cinnamate) and a carbamate monomer ("B", tetrahydropyran-2-yl N-(2-methacryloxyethyl) carbamate). Polymerization of the two synthesized monomers is carried out through a radical polymerization using azobisisobutrylnitrile (ABIN) in tetrahydropyran (THP) with the temperature of 60 °C.

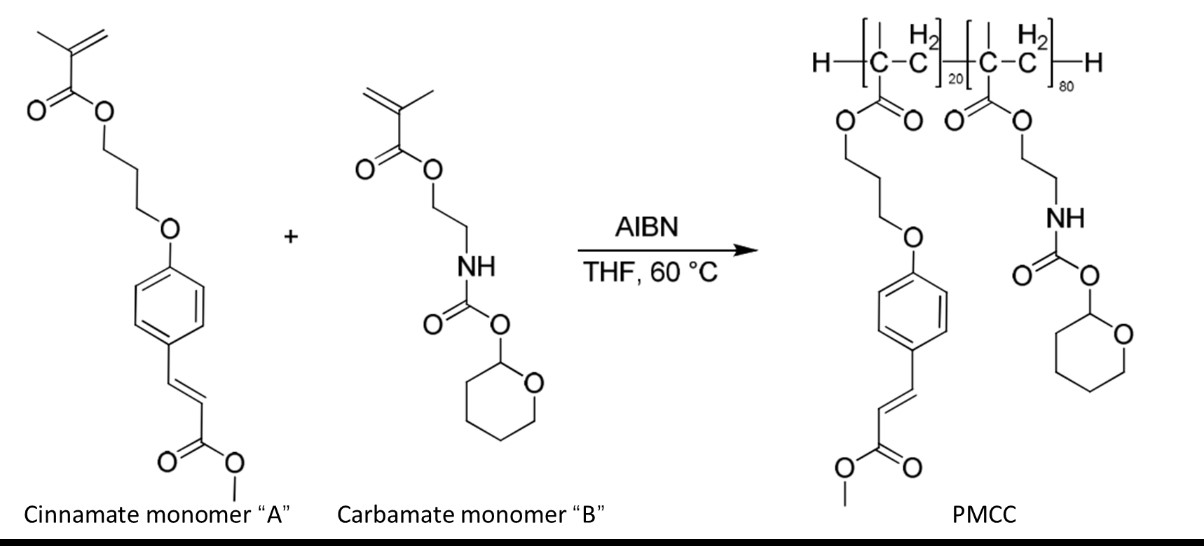
Synthesis of the cinnamate-carbamate copolymer

== Chemical properties ==
=== Pyrolysis ===
PMCC possesses two distinct decomposition/deprotection temperatures (T_{d}). One starts around 150 °C and accounts for 80% of the mass loss, and the second starts around 210 °C that accounts for the last 20%. When decomposition temperature is 150-180 °C, the carbamate monomer "B" of PMCC tends to decompose to carbon dioxide, 3,4-Dihydro-2H-pyran and polymer with primary amine groups.

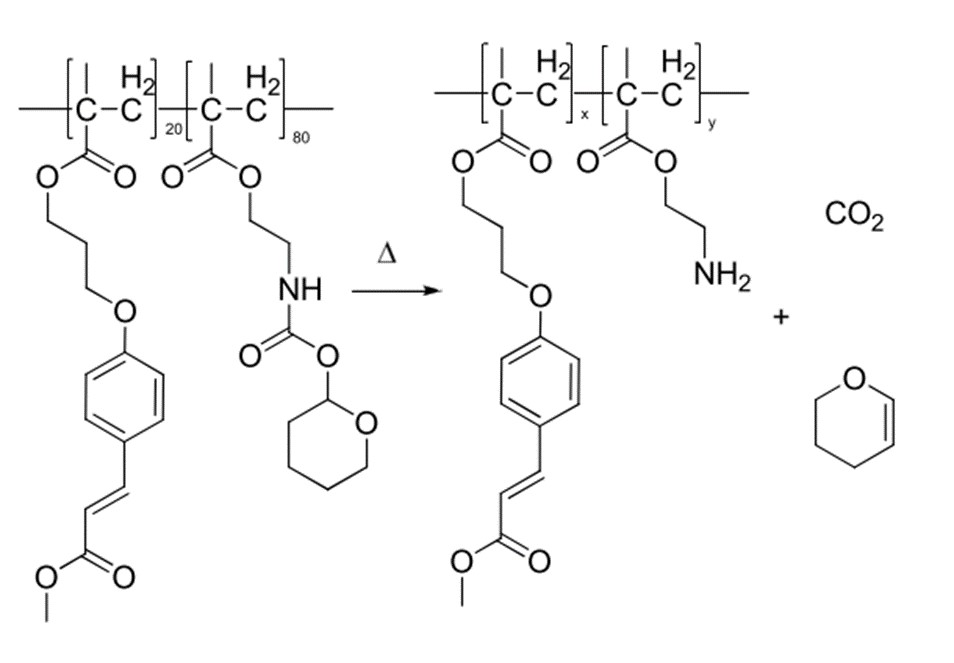
Pyrolysis of PMCC

== Applications ==
PMCC is used mainly as a functional layer for grafting chemicals on substrates in nanoscale chemical patterning together with thermochemical nanolithography (tc-SPL) which involves the use of a heated nanoscale tip to thermally deprotect amine groups on the PMCC polymer surface. It has been found that PMCC below a certain molecular weight is detrimental to materials properties in such applications, with molecular weights into the tens-of-thousands of g/mol being ideal for highest patterning resolution in tc-SPL. Patterning resolution with tc-SPL on PMCC as small as sub-10 nm, with depths as small as sub-2nm and at speeds up to millimeters per second have been reported. After the deprotection of the PMCC, the chemical function of the pattern is achieved by attaching various nano-objects to exposed amine groups.

Liu et al. demonstrated the ability to create complex patterns with different functionalities by using PMCC and tc-SPL technology, including the electrostatic immobilization of negatively charged sulfonated enzymes at positively charged amine patterns. These capabilities have significant implications for nanobiotechnology, as they could be used for the development of protein chips, and in studies of nanoelectronics fabrications.
