= PDMS stamp =

Patterned silicone piece

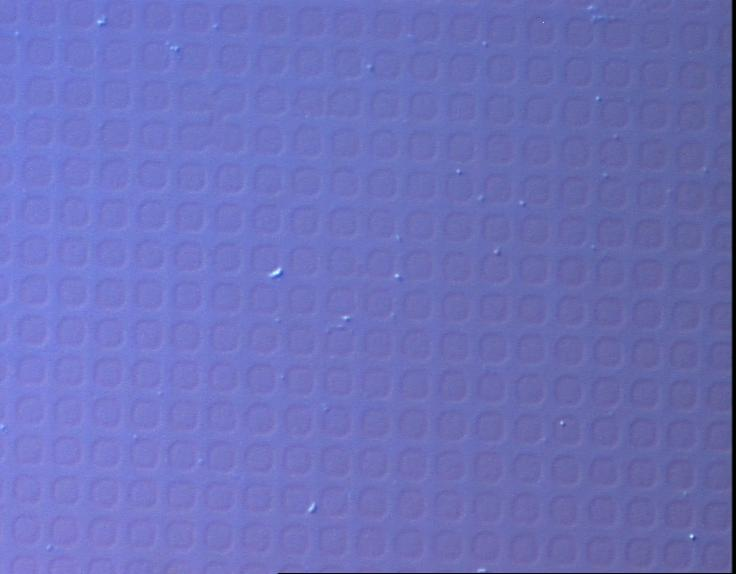
Sarfus image of streptavidin deposited by soft lithography with PDMS stamp.

PDMS stamps are pieces of polydimethylsiloxane (PDMS), a silicone, that have been patterned, usually against a master mold to form a relief pattern used in soft lithography. This PDMS stamp can be used in its current form as a relief surface, for techniques such as microcontact printing, or it can be attached to an external source by tubing so that liquid may be passed through channels on its surface. In this second case it will often be laminated to a surface so that chemistry can be performed on that surface producing a pattern of the PDMS stamp on to the surface. Alternatively a PDMS stamp can be laminated to a second piece of PDMS to form a contained device. It is possible to pattern PDMS with nanometre resolution.

PDMS stamps can be procured from some commercial sources such as research micro-stamps.

Many techniques have been developed to modify the basic setups to perform a range of tasks, such as assays on small volumes. These kinds of devices are often referred to as microfluidic devices. Because of the small dimensions of these devices flow is laminar, not turbulent, which can lead to many useful properties; however, this reduces the ability of fluid streams to mix.

== A new concept of PDMS stamp for multiplexing: the macrostamp ==
The main drawback of microcontact printing for biomedical application is that it is not possible to print different molecules with one stamp. To print different (bio)molecules in one step, a new concept is proposed : the macrostamp. It is a stamp composed of dots. The space between the dots corresponds to the space between the wells of a microplate. Then, it is possible to ink, dry and print in one step different molecules.

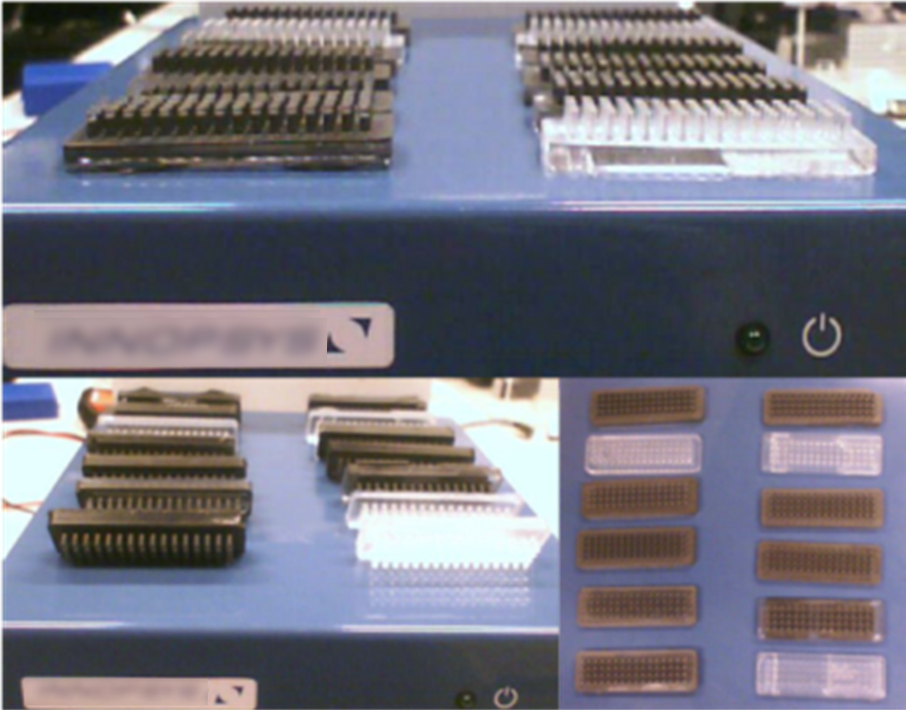
examples of macrostamp and magnetic macrostamp

== A new PDMS stamp: the Magnetic Stamp ==
To apply a homogeneous pressure during the printing step, a magnetic force is used. For that, the stamp is sensitive to a magnetic field by injecting iron powder into a second layer of PDMS. This force can be adjusted for nano and micro-patterns. Fully automated micro contact printing equipment was developed. It consists of the steps of the micro contact printing process: loading, inking, drying, printing, alignment, cleaning, unloading. A pipetting module is used to deposit some drop of liquids like ethanol. This equipment is named InnoSTAMP40.

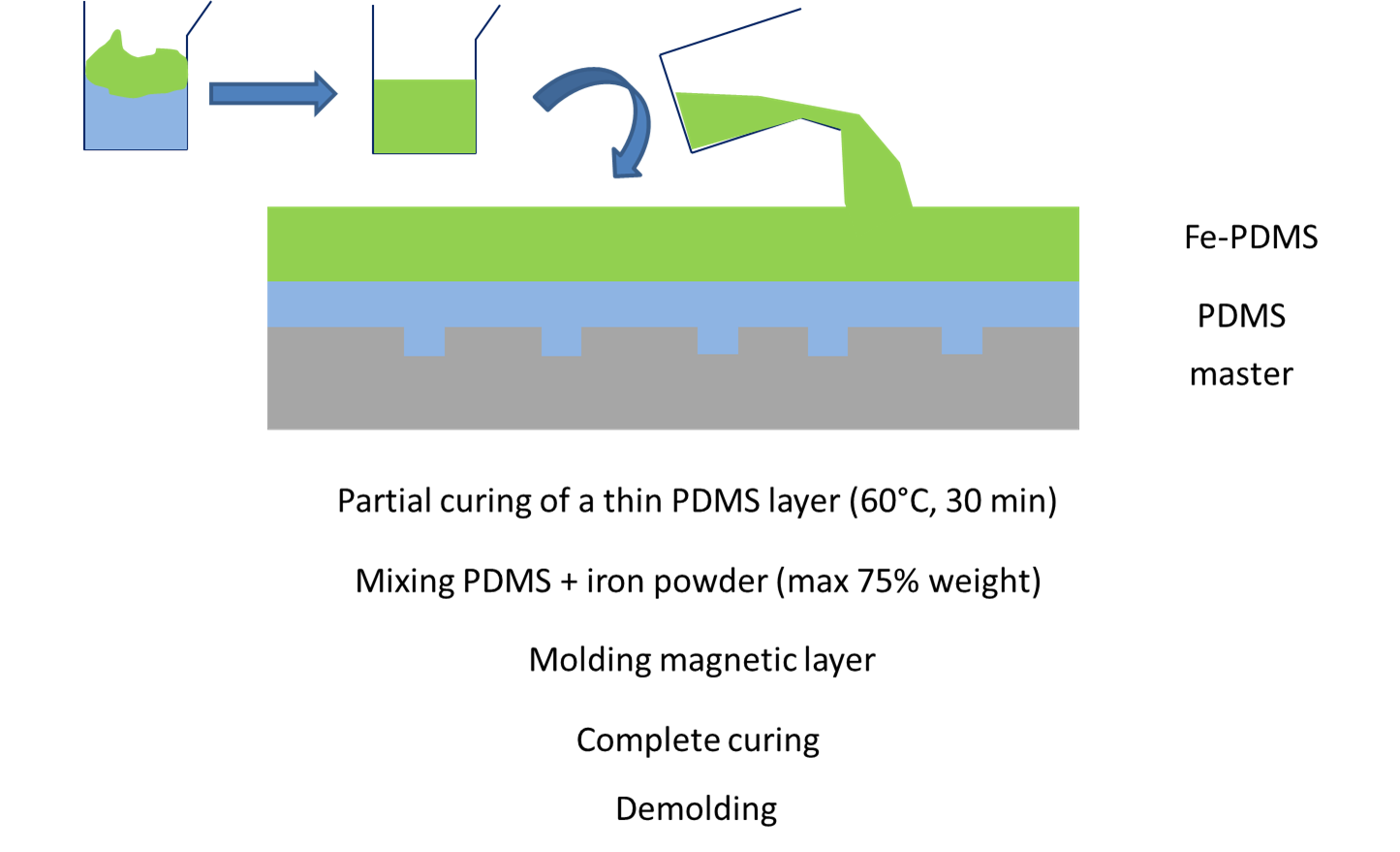
protocol to fabricate a magnetic stamp

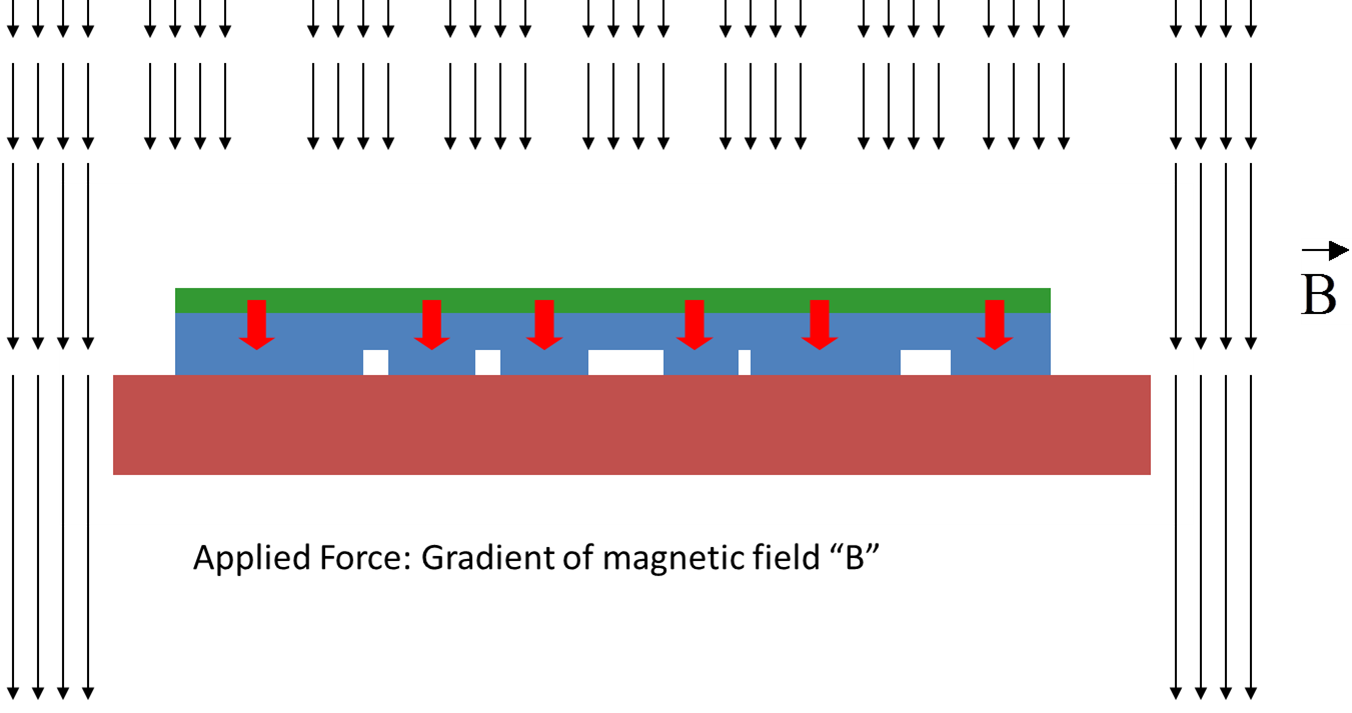
description of magnetic field assisted microcontact printing
