= Hydrogen silsesquioxane =

Inorganic compound

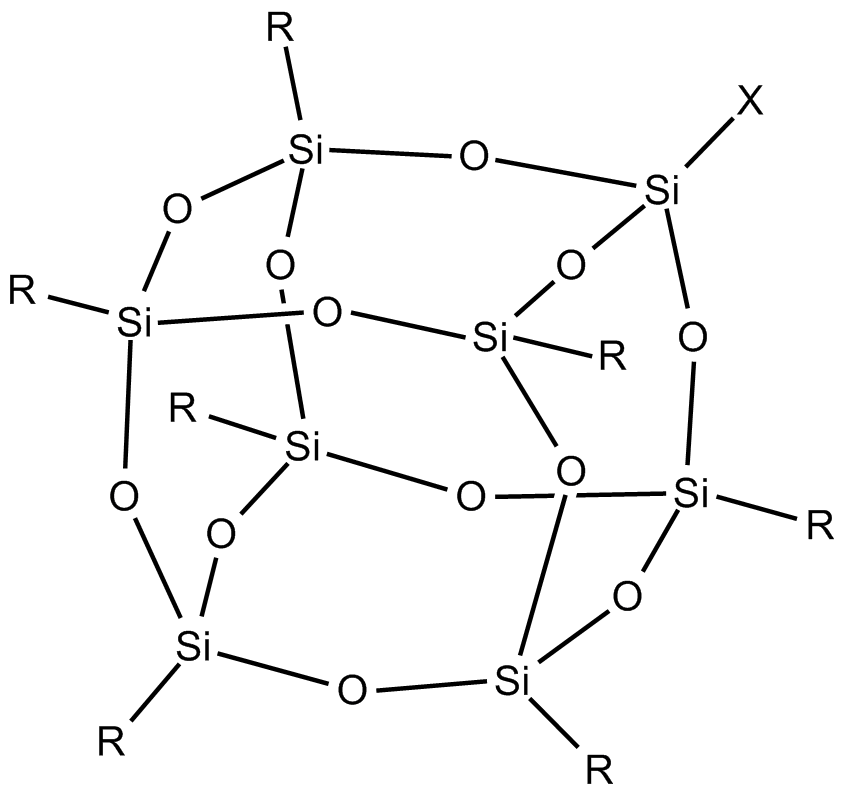
Hydrogen silsesquioxane (R = H).

Hydrogen silsesquioxane(s) (HSQ, H-SiO_{x}, T^{H}_{n}, H-resin) are inorganic compounds with the empirical formula [HSiO_{3/2}]_{n}. The cubic H_{8}Si_{8}O_{12} (T^{H}_{8}) is used as the visual representation for HSQ. T^{H}_{8}, T^{H}_{10}, T^{H}_{12}, and T^{H}_{14} have been characterized by elemental analysis, gas chromatography–mass spectroscopy (GC-MS), IR spectroscopy, and NMR spectroscopy.

High purity semiconductor-grade HSQ has been investigated as a negative resist in photolithography and electron-beam (e-beam) lithography. HSQ is commonly delivered in methyl isobutyl ketone (MIBK) and can be used to form 0.01–2 μm films on substrates/wafers. When exposed to electrons or extreme ultraviolet radiation (EUV), HSQ cross-links via hydrogen evolution concomitant with Si-O bond crosslinking. Recently, the possibility of crosslinking HSQ using ultrashort laser pulses through multiphoton absorption and its application to 3D printing of silica glass have been demonstrated. Sufficiently dosed and exposed regions form a low dielectric constant (low-k) Si rich oxide that is chemically resistant/insoluble towards developers, such as tetramethylammonium hydroxide (TMAH). Sub-10 nm patterning is achievable with HSQ. The nanoscale patterning capabilities and low-k of the Si rich oxide produced is potentially of broad scope of nano applications and devices.

HSQ has been available as 1 and 6% (wt%) MIBK solutions from Dow Inc. (Formally Dow Corning), called XR-1541-001 and XR-1541-006, respectively. HSQ in MIBK has a short shelf life. Alternatively, Applied Quantum Materials Inc. (AQM) produces HSQ with a longer shelf life. HSQ solutions derived from AQM dry silone resin are available in the United States from DisChem, Inc in concentrations ranging from 1-20% in MIBK under the brand name H-SiQ. EM Resist Ltd (UK) also supplies HSQ worldwide both as powder and in solution in concentrations up to 32%.
