= Vapor etching =

Vapor etching refers to a process used in the fabrication of Microelectromechanical systems (MEMS) and Nanoelectromechanical systems (NEMS). Sacrificial layers are isotropically etched using gaseous acids such as Hydrogen fluoride and Xenon difluoride to release the free standing components of the device.

Economic advantages and novel technological possibilities result from micron to nano scale size reductions. (MEMS to NEMS) The small dimensions make the use of isotropic wet etch processes traditionally used in micro fabrication suffer from stiction, the permanent adherence of the free standing structure to the underlying substrate due to the scaling of surface effects occurring during the drying of the acid. Vapor etching overcomes stiction because no liquids are used during the etch process. Commonly, hydrogen fluoride and xenon difluorides are used to etch silicon dioxide and silicon sacrificial layers respectively.

== HF vapor etching ==
The wet etching of SiO_{2} in buffered hydrogen fluoride solutions is a common and well understood process in micro fabrication. In 1966, Holmes and Snell found that SiO_{2} can be etched in hydrogen fluoride vapor. Initially the interest in this finding was low, because wet etch processes have higher etch rates and did not require sophisticated equipment. During the advent of MEMS technology and the consecutive reduction of size however, stiction started to have a significant impact on the production yields. Therefore HF vapor etching became an interesting commercial fabrication technology. Water or an alcohol catalysts are required, because anhydrous HF does not etch SiO_{2}.

=== Etch chemistry ===
The etch chemistry depends on the catalyst used.

==== Etch reaction with water catalyst ====
If water is used, the H_{2}O is adsorbed at the SiO_{2} surface and forms silanol groups can never form.

SiO_{2} + 2 H_{2}O → Si(OH)_{4}

The HF reacts with the silanol groups and forms SiF_{4} and H_{2}O according to the following reaction.

Si(OH)_{4} + 4 HF → SiF_{4} + 4 H_{2}O

The etch process commonly takes place at reduced pressures, to promote the desorption of the reaction products. Water is formed during the etch reaction. The efficient H_{2}O removal is critical to prevent the formation of a liquid layer.

==== Etch reaction with alcohol catalyst ====
Alternatively, different alcohols such as methanol, ethanol, 1-propanol or IPA can be used to initiate the reaction. An example for this reaction, using methanol (CH_{3}OH) is given below. Firstly the HF and the methanol are absorbed to the surface.

CH_{3}OH (g) ↔ CH_{3}OH (ads)

HF (g) ↔ HF (ads)

HF^{−}_{2} is formed by an ionization reaction of the absorbed HF and absorbed CH_{3}OH

2 HF (ads) + CH_{3}OH (ads) → HF^{−}_{2} (ads) + CH_{3}OH^{+}_{2} (ads)

The ionized HF then reacts with the SiO_{2} according to the following reaction.

SiO_{2} (s) + 2 HF^{−}_{2} (ads) + 2 CH_{3}OH^{+}_{2} (ads) → SiF_{4} (ads) + 2 H_{2}O (ads) + 2 CH_{3}OH

Finally the reaction products are removed from the surface by desorption.

== XeF_{2} vapor etching ==
Xenon difluoride, bromine trifluoride, chlorine trifluoride and fluorine can be used for gaseous silicon etching. Xenon difluoride is most commonly used to etch silicon in academia and industry, because it has a high selectivity towards other semiconductor materials, allows high process control and is easy to use at room temperature.

=== Etch systems ===
The synthesis of XeF_{2} is an endothermic process which results in a white powder which sublimes at low pressures. (P < 4 Torr) The low vapor pressure allowed early researchers and engineers to use it in comparatively simple set ups. Modern vapour etch tools are more sophisticated and are characterized by the way the gas is feed into the etch chamber. In pulsed systems the etchant is expanded, feed into the reaction chamber and remains there until it has been consumed by the reaction. Then the chamber is evacuated and this process is repeated for multiple cycles. In contrast to that, a carrier gas flows through a bubbler to continuously supply xenon difluoride into the etch chamber in continuous flow systems.

=== Etch chemistry ===
The general etch reaction is summarized by the following equation.

2 XeF_{2} + Si → SiF_{4} + 2 Xe

The detailed etch kinetic is more complex reaction consisting of four steps. After the etchant has been mass transported to the silicon surface, the xenon difluoride is absorbed on the silicon surface.

2 XeF_{2} (gas) + Si (s) → 2 XeF_{2} (abs) + Si (s)

The XeF_{2} disassociates into absorbed fluorine and gaseous Xe.

2 XeF_{2} (abs) + Si (s) → 2 Xe (g) + 2 F (abs) + Si (s)

The fluorine bonds with the surface silicon to form silicon tetra fluoride.

2 Xe (g) + 2 F (abs) + Si (s) → 2 Xe (g) + SiF_{4} (ads)

The reaction product is desorpted from the silicon surface.

2 Xe (g) + SiF_{4} (ads) → " Xe (g) + SiF_{4} (g)

The reaction products are mass transferred from the surface to the etch chamber, and ejected from there by a vacuum pump.
