= Interconnect (disambiguation) =

An interconnect is a link between telecommunications networks.

Interconnect may also refer to :

- Interconnect (integrated circuits)
- Grid connection, a connection to or from an electrical grid
