= Front end of line =

Part of manufacturing process used to create integrated circuits

Illustration of FEOL (device generation in the silicon, bottom) and BEOL (depositing metalization layers, middle part) to connect the devices.

CMOS fabrication process

The front end of line (FEOL) is the first portion of IC fabrication where the individual components (transistors, capacitors, resistors, etc.) are patterned in a semiconductor substrate. FEOL generally covers everything up to (but not including) the deposition of metal interconnect layers.

== Steps ==
For the CMOS process, FEOL contains all fabrication steps needed to form isolated CMOS elements:

1. Selecting the type of wafer to be used; Chemical-mechanical planarization (CMP) and cleaning of the wafer.
2. Shallow trench isolation (STI) (or LOCOS in early processes with feature size > 0.25 μm);
3. Well formation;
4. Gate module formation;
5. Source and drain module formation.

Finally, the surface is treated to prepare the contacts for the subsequent metallization. This concludes the FEOL process, that is, all devices have been built.

Following these steps, the devices must be connected electrically as per the nets to build the electrical circuit. This is done in the back end of line (BEOL). BEOL is thus the second portion of IC fabrication where the individual devices are connected.

== See also ==
- Back end of line (BEOL)
- Integrated circuit
