= Nanoelectromechanical systems =

Class of devices for nanoscale functionality

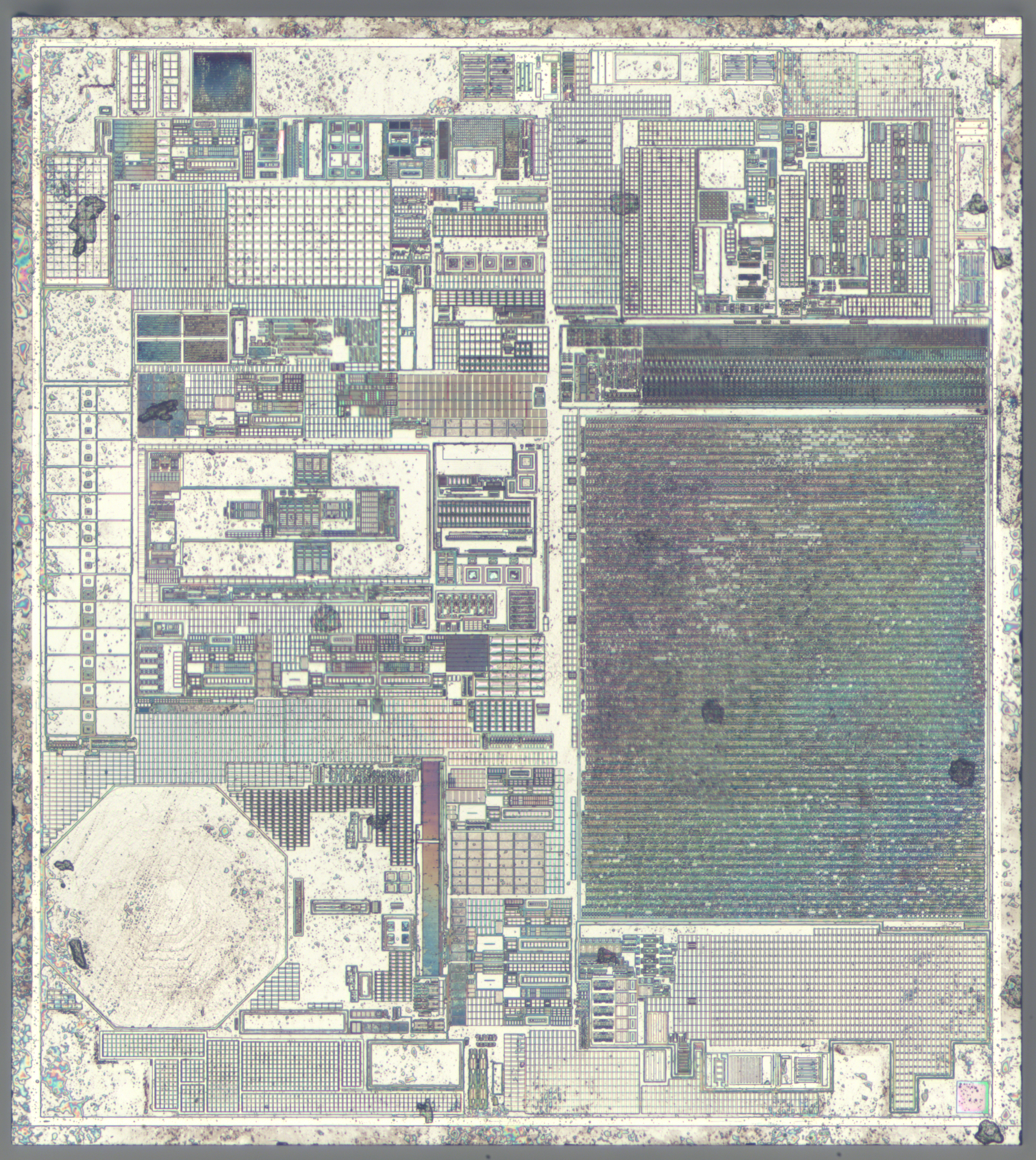
A die shot (after metallization/ IC interconnect removal) of the digital die of the SiTime SiT8008, a programmable oscillator reaching quartz precision with high reliability and low g-sensitivity. The nanoscale transistors and nanoscale mechanical components (on a separate die) are integrated on the same chip package.

Nanoelectromechanical systems (NEMS) are a class of devices integrating electrical and mechanical functionality on the nanoscale. NEMS form the next logical miniaturization step from so-called microelectromechanical systems, or MEMS devices. NEMS typically integrate transistor-like nanoelectronics with mechanical actuators, pumps, or motors, and may thereby form physical, biological, and chemical sensors. The name derives from typical device dimensions in the nanometer range, leading to low mass, high mechanical resonance frequencies, potentially large quantum mechanical effects such as zero point motion, and a high surface-to-volume ratio useful for surface-based sensing mechanisms. Applications include accelerometers and sensors to detect chemical substances in the air.

== History ==
=== Background ===
As noted by Richard Feynman in his famous talk in 1959, "There's Plenty of Room at the Bottom", there are many potential applications of machines at smaller and smaller sizes; by building and controlling devices at smaller scales, all technology benefits. The expected benefits include greater efficiencies and reduced size, decreased power consumption and lower costs of production in electromechanical systems.

The first silicon dioxide field effect transistors were built by Frosch and Derick in 1957 at Bell Labs. In 1960, Atalla and Kahng at Bell Labs fabricated a MOSFET with a gate oxide thickness of 100 nm. In 1962, Atalla and Kahng fabricated a nanolayer-base metal–semiconductor junction (M–S junction) transistor that used gold (Au) thin films with a thickness of 10 nm. In 1987, Bijan Davari led an IBM research team that demonstrated the first MOSFET with a 10 nm oxide thickness. Multi-gate MOSFETs enabled scaling below 20 nm channel length, starting with the FinFET. The FinFET originates from the research of Digh Hisamoto at Hitachi Central Research Laboratory in 1989. At UC Berkeley, a group led by Hisamoto and TSMC's Chenming Hu fabricated FinFET devices down to 17 nm channel length in 1998.

=== NEMS ===
In 2000, the first very-large-scale integration (VLSI) NEMS device was demonstrated by researchers at IBM. Its premise was an array of AFM tips which can heat/sense a deformable substrate in order to function as a memory device (Millipede memory). Further devices have been described by Stefan de Haan. In 2007, the International Technical Roadmap for Semiconductors (ITRS) contains NEMS memory as a new entry for the Emerging Research Devices section.

== Atomic force microscopy ==
A key application of NEMS is atomic force microscope tips. The increased sensitivity achieved by NEMS leads to smaller and more efficient sensors to detect stresses, vibrations, forces at the atomic level, and chemical signals. AFM tips and other detection at the nanoscale rely heavily on NEMS.

== Approaches to miniaturization ==
Two complementary approaches to fabrication of NEMS can be found, the top-down approach and the bottom-up approach.

The top-down approach uses the traditional microfabrication methods, i.e. optical, electron-beam lithography and thermal treatments, to manufacture devices. While being limited by the resolution of these methods, it allows a large degree of control over the resulting structures. In this manner devices such as nanowires, nanorods, and patterned nanostructures are fabricated from metallic thin films or etched semiconductor layers. For top-down approaches, increasing surface area to volume ratio enhances the reactivity of nanomaterials.

Bottom-up approaches, in contrast, use the chemical properties of single molecules to cause single-molecule components to self-organize or self-assemble into some useful conformation, or rely on positional assembly. These approaches utilize the concepts of molecular self-assembly and/or molecular recognition. This allows fabrication of much smaller structures, albeit often at the cost of limited control of the fabrication process. Furthermore, while there are residue materials removed from the original structure for the top-down approach, minimal material is removed or wasted for the bottom-up approach.

A combination of these approaches may also be used, in which nanoscale molecules are integrated into a top-down framework. One such example is the carbon nanotube nanomotor.

== Materials ==
=== Carbon allotropes ===
Many of the commonly used materials for NEMS technology have been carbon based, specifically diamond, carbon nanotubes and graphene. This is mainly because of the useful properties of carbon based materials which directly meet the needs of NEMS. The mechanical properties of carbon (such as large Young's modulus) are fundamental to the stability of NEMS while the metallic and semiconductor conductivities of carbon based materials allow them to function as transistors.

Both graphene and diamond exhibit high Young's modulus, low density, low friction, exceedingly low mechanical dissipation, and large surface area. The low friction of CNTs, allow practically frictionless bearings and has thus been a huge motivation towards practical applications of CNTs as constitutive elements in NEMS, such as nanomotors, switches, and high-frequency oscillators. Carbon nanotubes and graphene's physical strength allows carbon based materials to meet higher stress demands, when common materials would normally fail and thus further support their use as a major materials in NEMS technological development.

Along with the mechanical benefits of carbon based materials, the electrical properties of carbon nanotubes and graphene allow it to be used in many electrical components of NEMS. Nanotransistors have been developed for both carbon nanotubes as well as graphene. Transistors are one of the basic building blocks for all electronic devices, so by effectively developing usable transistors, carbon nanotubes and graphene are both very crucial to NEMS.

Nanomechanical resonators are frequently made of graphene. As NEMS resonators are scaled down in size, there is a general trend for a decrease in quality factor in inverse proportion to surface area to volume ratio. However, despite this challenge, it has been experimentally proven to reach a quality factor as high as 2400. The quality factor describes the purity of tone of the resonator's vibrations. Furthermore, it has been theoretically predicted that clamping graphene membranes on all sides yields increased quality numbers. Graphene NEMS can also function as mass, force, and position sensors.

==== Metallic carbon nanotubes ====
Band structures computed using tight binding approximation for (6,0) CNT (zigzag, metallic), (10,2) CNT (semiconducting) and (10,10) CNT (armchair, metallic)

Carbon nanotubes (CNTs) are allotropes of carbon with a cylindrical nanostructure. They can be considered a rolled up graphene. When rolled at specific and discrete ("chiral") angles, and the combination of the rolling angle and radius decides whether the nanotube has a bandgap (semiconducting) or no bandgap (metallic).

Metallic carbon nanotubes have also been proposed for nanoelectronic interconnects since they can carry high current densities. This is a useful property as wires to transfer current are another basic building block of any electrical system. Carbon nanotubes have specifically found so much use in NEMS that methods have already been discovered to connect suspended carbon nanotubes to other nanostructures. This allows carbon nanotubes to form complicated nanoelectric systems. Because carbon based products can be properly controlled and act as interconnects as well as transistors, they serve as a fundamental material in the electrical components of NEMS.

==== CNT-based NEMS switches ====
A major disadvantage of MEMS switches over NEMS switches are limited microsecond range switching speeds of MEMS, which impedes performance for high speed applications. Limitations on switching speed and actuation voltage can be overcome by scaling down devices from micro to nanometer scale. A comparison of performance parameters between carbon nanotube (CNT)-based NEMS switches with its counterpart CMOS revealed that CNT-based NEMS switches retained performance at lower levels of energy consumption and had a subthreshold leakage current several orders of magnitude smaller than that of CMOS switches. CNT-based NEMS with doubly clamped structures are being further studied as potential solutions for floating gate nonvolatile memory applications.

==== Difficulties ====
Despite all of the useful properties of carbon nanotubes and graphene for NEMS technology, both of these products face several hindrances to their implementation. One of the main problems is carbon's response to real life environments. Carbon nanotubes exhibit a large change in electronic properties when exposed to oxygen. Similarly, other changes to the electronic and mechanical attributes of carbon based materials must fully be explored before their implementation, especially because of their high surface area which can easily react with surrounding environments. Carbon nanotubes were also found to have varying conductivities, being either metallic or semiconducting depending on their helicity when processed. Because of this, special treatment must be given to the nanotubes during processing to assure that all of the nanotubes have appropriate conductivities. Graphene also has complicated electric conductivity properties compared to traditional semiconductors because it lacks an energy band gap and essentially changes all the rules for how electrons move through a graphene based device. This means that traditional constructions of electronic devices will likely not work and completely new architectures must be designed for these new electronic devices.

==== Nanoelectromechanical accelerometer ====
Graphene's mechanical and electronic properties have made it favorable for integration into NEMS accelerometers, such as small sensors and actuators for heart monitoring systems and mobile motion capture. The atomic scale thickness of graphene provides a pathway for accelerometers to be scaled down from micro to nanoscale while retaining the system's required sensitivity levels.

By suspending a silicon proof mass on a double-layer graphene ribbon, a nanoscale spring-mass and piezoresistive transducer can be made with the capability of currently produced transducers in accelerometers. The spring mass provides greater accuracy, and the piezoresistive properties of graphene converts the strain from acceleration to electrical signals for the accelerometer. The suspended graphene ribbon simultaneously forms the spring and piezoresistive transducer, making efficient use of space in while improving performance of NEMS accelerometers.

=== Polydimethylsiloxane (PDMS) ===
Failures arising from high adhesion and friction are of concern for many NEMS. NEMS frequently utilize silicon due to well-characterized micromachining techniques; however, its intrinsic stiffness often hinders the capability of devices with moving parts.

A study conducted by Ohio State researchers compared the adhesion and friction parameters of a single crystal silicon with native oxide layer against PDMS coating. PDMS is a silicone elastomer that is highly mechanically tunable, chemically inert, thermally stable, permeable to gases, transparent, non-fluorescent, biocompatible, and nontoxic. Inherent to polymers, the Young's Modulus of PDMS can vary over two orders of magnitude by manipulating the extent of crosslinking of polymer chains, making it a viable material in NEMS and biological applications. PDMS can form a tight seal with silicon and thus be easily integrated into NEMS technology, optimizing both mechanical and electrical properties. Polymers like PDMS are beginning to gain attention in NEMS due to their comparatively inexpensive, simplified, and time-efficient prototyping and manufacturing.

Rest time has been characterized to directly correlate with adhesive force, and increased relative humidity lead to an increase of adhesive forces for hydrophilic polymers. Contact angle measurements and Laplace force calculations support the characterization of PDMS's hydrophobic nature, which expectedly corresponds with its experimentally verified independence to relative humidity. PDMS' adhesive forces are also independent of rest time, capable of versatilely performing under varying relative humidity conditions, and possesses a lower coefficient of friction than that of Silicon. PDMS coatings facilitate mitigation of high-velocity problems, such as preventing sliding. Thus, friction at contact surfaces remains low even at considerably high velocities. In fact, on the microscale, friction reduces with increasing velocity. The hydrophobicity and low friction coefficient of PDMS have given rise to its potential in being further incorporated within NEMS experiments that are conducted at varying relative humidities and high relative sliding velocities.

==== PDMS-coated piezoresistive nanoelectromechanical systems diaphragm ====
PDMS is frequently used within NEMS technology. For instance, PDMS coating on a diaphragm can be used for chloroform vapor detection.

Researchers from the National University of Singapore invented a polydimethylsiloxane (PDMS)-coated nanoelectromechanical system diaphragm embedded with silicon nanowires (SiNWs) to detect chloroform vapor at room temperature. In the presence of chloroform vapor, the PDMS film on the micro-diaphragm absorbs vapor molecules and consequently enlarges, leading to deformation of the micro-diaphragm. The SiNWs implanted within the micro-diaphragm are linked in a Wheatstone bridge, which translates the deformation into a quantitative output voltage. In addition, the micro-diaphragm sensor also demonstrates low-cost processing at low power consumption. It possesses great potential for scalability, ultra-compact footprint, and CMOS-IC process compatibility. By switching the vapor-absorption polymer layer, similar methods can be applied that should theoretically be able to detect other organic vapors.

In addition to its inherent properties discussed in the Materials section, PDMS can be used to absorb chloroform, whose effects are commonly associated with swelling and deformation of the micro-diaphragm; various organic vapors were also gauged in this study. With good aging stability and appropriate packaging, the degradation rate of PDMS in response to heat, light, and radiation can be slowed.

=== Biohybrid NEMS ===
A ribosome is a biological machine that utilizes protein dynamics on nanoscales

The emerging field of bio-hybrid systems combines biological and synthetic structural elements for biomedical or robotic applications. The constituting elements of bio-nanoelectromechanical systems (BioNEMS) are of nanoscale size, for example DNA, proteins or nanostructured mechanical parts. Examples include the facile top-down nanostructuring of thiol-ene polymers to create cross-linked and mechanically robust nanostructures that are subsequently functionalized with proteins.

== Simulations ==
Computer simulations have long been important counterparts to experimental studies of NEMS devices. Through continuum mechanics and molecular dynamics (MD), important behaviors of NEMS devices can be predicted via computational modeling before engaging in experiments. Additionally, combining continuum and MD techniques enables engineers to efficiently analyze the stability of NEMS devices without resorting to ultra-fine meshes and time-intensive simulations. Simulations have other advantages as well: they do not require the time and expertise associated with fabricating NEMS devices; they can effectively predict the interrelated roles of various electromechanical effects; and parametric studies can be conducted fairly readily as compared with experimental approaches. For example, computational studies have predicted the charge distributions and "pull-in" electromechanical responses of NEMS devices. Using simulations to predict mechanical and electrical behavior of these devices can help optimize NEMS device design parameters.

== Reliability and Life Cycle of NEMS ==
=== Reliability and Challenges ===
Reliability provides a quantitative measure of the component's integrity and performance without failure for a specified product lifetime. Failure of NEMS devices can be attributed to a variety of sources, such as mechanical, electrical, chemical, and thermal factors. Identifying failure mechanisms, improving yield, scarcity of information, and reproducibility issues have been identified as major challenges to achieving higher levels of reliability for NEMS devices. Such challenges arise during both manufacturing stages (i.e. wafer processing, packaging, final assembly) and post-manufacturing stages (i.e. transportation, logistics, usage).

==== Packaging ====
Packaging challenges often account for 75–95% of the overall costs of MEMS and NEMS. Factors of wafer dicing, device thickness, sequence of final release, thermal expansion, mechanical stress isolation, power and heat dissipation, creep minimization, media isolation, and protective coatings are considered by packaging design to align with the design of the MEMS or NEMS component. Delamination analysis, motion analysis, and life-time testing have been used to assess wafer-level encapsulation techniques, such as cap to wafer, wafer to wafer, and thin film encapsulation. Wafer-level encapsulation techniques can lead to improved reliability and increased yield for both micro and nanodevices.

==== Manufacturing ====
Assessing the reliability of NEMS in early stages of the manufacturing process is essential for yield improvement. Forms of surface forces, such as adhesion and electrostatic forces, are largely dependent on surface topography and contact geometry. Selective manufacturing of nano-textured surfaces reduces contact area, improving both adhesion and friction performance for NEMS. Furthermore, the implementation of nanopost to engineered surfaces increase hydrophobicity, leading to a reduction in both adhesion and friction.

Adhesion and friction can also be manipulated by nanopatterning to adjust surface roughness for the appropriate applications of the NEMS device. Researchers from Ohio State University used atomic/friction force microscopy (AFM/FFM) to examine the effects of nanopatterning on hydrophobicity, adhesion, and friction for hydrophilic polymers with two types of patterned asperities (low aspect ratio and high aspect ratio). Roughness on hydrophilic surfaces versus hydrophobic surfaces are found to have inversely correlated and directly correlated relationships respectively.

Due to its large surface area to volume ratio and sensitivity, adhesion and friction can impede performance and reliability of NEMS devices. These tribological issues arise from natural down-scaling of these tools; however, the system can be optimized through the manipulation of the structural material, surface films, and lubricant. In comparison to undoped Si or polysilicon films, SiC films possess the lowest frictional output, resulting in increased scratch resistance and enhanced functionality at high temperatures. Hard diamond-like carbon (DLC) coatings exhibit low friction, high hardness and wear resistance, in addition to chemical and electrical resistances. Roughness, a factor that reduces wetting and increases hydrophobicity, can be optimized by increasing the contact angle to reduce wetting and allow for low adhesion and interaction of the device to its environment.

Material properties are size-dependent. Therefore, analyzing the unique characteristics on NEMS and nano-scale material becomes increasingly important to retaining reliability and long-term stability of NEMS devices. Some mechanical properties, such as hardness, elastic modulus, and bend tests, for nano-materials are determined by using a nano indenter on a material that has undergone fabrication processes. These measurements, however, do not consider how the device will operate in industry under prolonged or cyclic stresses and strains. The theta structure is a NEMS model that exhibits unique mechanical properties. Composed of Si, the structure has high strength and is able to concentrate stresses at the nanoscale to measure certain mechanical properties of materials.

==== Residual stresses ====
To increase reliability of structural integrity, characterization of both material structure and intrinsic stresses at appropriate length scales becomes increasingly pertinent. Effects of residual stresses include but are not limited to fracture, deformation, delamination, and nanosized structural changes, which can result in failure of operation and physical deterioration of the device.

Residual stresses can influence electrical and optical properties. For instance, in various photovoltaic and light emitting diodes (LED) applications, the band gap energy of semiconductors can be tuned accordingly by the effects of residual stress.

Atomic force microscopy (AFM) and Raman spectroscopy can be used to characterize the distribution of residual stresses on thin films in terms of force volume imaging, topography, and force curves. Furthermore, residual stress can be used to measure nanostructures' melting temperature by using differential scanning calorimetry (DSC) and temperature dependent X-ray Diffraction (XRD).

== Future ==
Key hurdles currently preventing the commercial application of many NEMS devices include low-yields and high device quality variability. Before NEMS devices can actually be implemented, reasonable integrations of carbon based products must be created. A recent step in that direction has been demonstrated for diamond, achieving a processing level comparable to that of silicon. The focus is currently shifting from experimental work towards practical applications and device structures that will implement and profit from such novel devices. The next challenge to overcome involves understanding all of the properties of these carbon-based tools, and using the properties to make efficient and durable NEMS with low failure rates.

Carbon-based materials have served as prime materials for NEMS use, because of their exceptional mechanical and electrical properties.

Recently, nanowires of chalcogenide glasses have shown to be a key platform to design tunable NEMS owing to the availability of active modulation of Young's modulus.

The global market of NEMS is projected to reach $108.88 million by 2022.

== Applications ==
- Nanoelectromechanical relay
- Nanoelectromechanical systems mass spectrometer

=== Nanoelectromechanical-based cantilevers ===
Researchers from the California Institute of Technology developed a NEM-based cantilever with mechanical resonances up to very high frequencies (VHF). It is incorporation of electronic displacement transducers based on piezoresistive thin metal film facilitates unambiguous and efficient nanodevice readout. The functionalization of the device's surface using a thin polymer coating with high partition coefficient for the targeted species enables NEMS-based cantilevers to provide chemisorption measurements at room temperature with mass resolution at less than one attogram. Further capabilities of NEMS-based cantilevers have been exploited for the applications of sensors, scanning probes, and devices operating at very high frequency (100 MHz).
