= Nanoelectromechanical systems mass spectrometer =

A nanoelectromechanical systems mass spectrometer (NEMS-MS) is an instrument measuring the mass of analyte particles by detecting the frequency shift caused by the adsorption of the particles on a NEMS resonator.

NEMS-MS was invented by Prof. Michael Roukes and Dr. Kamil Ekinci at the California Institute of Technology in 1999. First attainment of attogram-scale mass sensitivity was documented in their 2001 patent disclosure. Successive NEMS-MS sensitivity milestones were reported by the Caltech researchers in publications appearing in 2004 (attogram-scale sensitivity) and in 2006 (zeptogram-scale sensitivity). They later developed single molecule analysis in 2009. Single-biomolecule mass measurements were first accomplished by this team in 2012. A hybrid NEMS-MS/TOF-MS instrument was reported in 2015.

== See also ==
- Nanoelectromechanical systems
- Quartz crystal microbalance
- Quartz crystal microbalance with dissipation monitoring
