= Microextrusion =

Microextrusion is a microforming extrusion process performed at the submillimeter range. Like extrusion, material is pushed through a die orifice, but the resulting product's cross section can fit through a 1mm square. Several microextrusion processes have been developed since microforming was envisioned in 1990. Forward (ram and billet move in the same direction) and backward (ram and billet move in the opposite direction) microextrusion were first introduced, with forward rod-backward cup and double cup extrusion methods developing later. Regardless of method, one of the greatest challenges of creating a successful microextrusion machine is the manufacture of the die and ram. "The small size of the die and ram, along with the stringent accuracy requirement, needs suitable manufacturing processes." Additionally, as Fu and Chan pointed out in a 2013 state-of-the-art technology review, several issues must still be resolved before microextrusion and other microforming technologies can be implemented more widely, including deformation load and defects, forming system stability, mechanical properties, and other size-related effects on the crystallite (grain) structure and boundaries.

== Development and use ==
Microextrusion is an outgrowth of microforming, a science that was in its infancy in the early 1990s. In 2002, Engel et al. expressed that up to that point, only a few research experiments involving micro-deep drawing and extruding processes had been attempted, citing limitations in shearing on billets and difficulties in tool manufacturing and handling. By the mid- to late 2000s, researchers were working on issues such as billet flow, interfacial friction, extrusion force, and size effects, "the deviations from the expected results that occur when the dimension of a workpiece or sample is reduced". Most recently, research into using ultrafine-grained material at higher formation temperatures and applying ultrasonic vibration to the process has pushed the science further. However, before bulk production of microparts such as pins, screws, fasteners, connectors, and sockets using microforming and microextrusion techniques can occur, more research into billet production, transportation, positioning, and ejection are required.

Microextrusion techniques have also been applied to bioceramic and plastic extrusion and the manufacture of components for resorbable and implantable medical devices, from bioresorbable stents to controlled drug release systems.

== Microextrusion processes ==
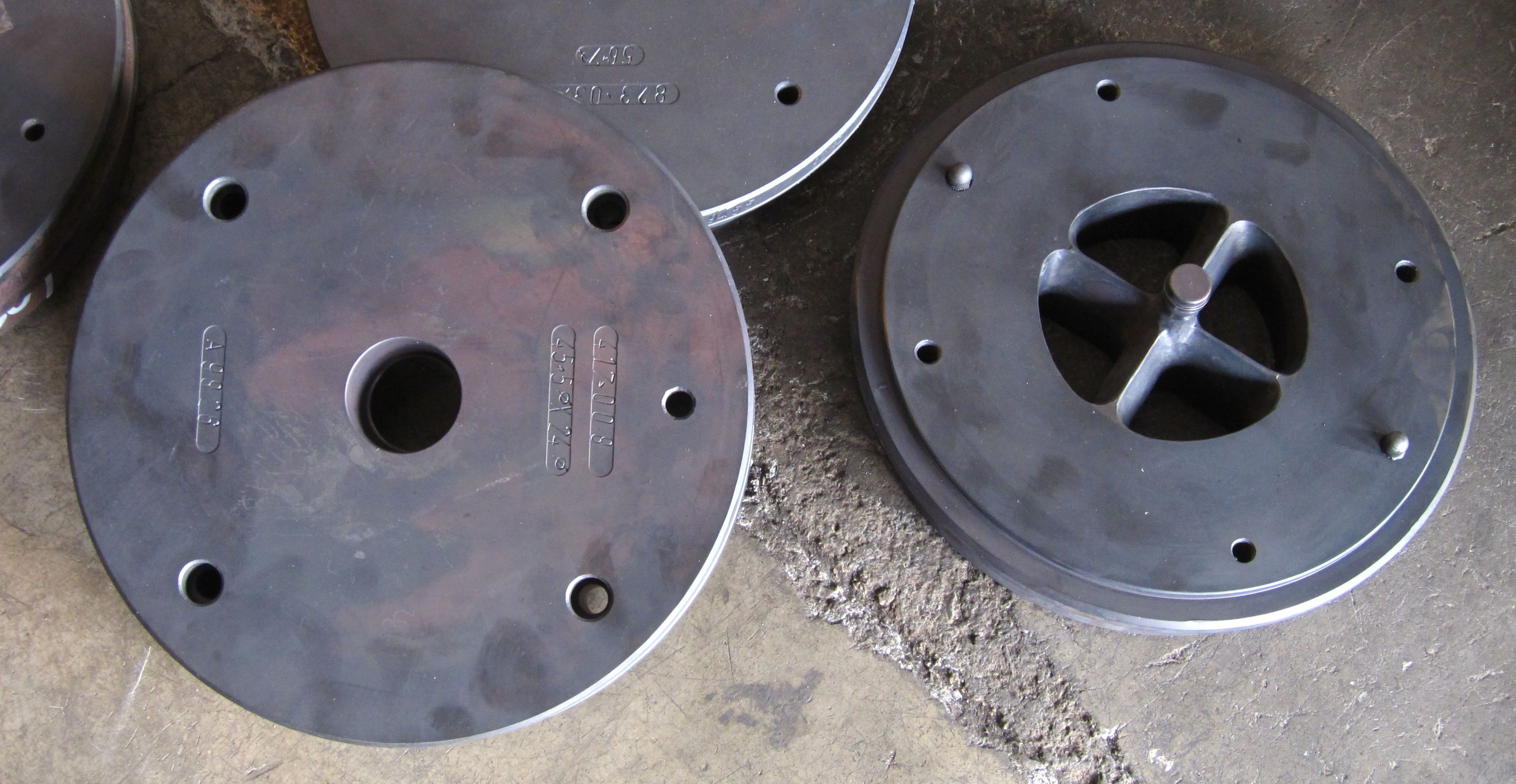
Two-piece aluminum extrusion die set used for forming tubing, illustrating the precision required at submillimetre scales.

Like normal macro-level extrusion, several similar microextrusion processes have been described over the years. The most basic processes were forward (direct) and backward (indirect) microextrusion. The ram (which propels the billet forward) and billet both move in the same direction with forward microextrusion, while in backward microextrusion has the ram and billet moving in opposite directions. These in turn have been applied to specialized applications such as the manufacture of microbillet, brass micropins, microgear shafts, and microcondensers. However, other processes have been applied to microextrusion, including forward rod–backward cup extrusion and double cup (one forward, one backward) extrusion.

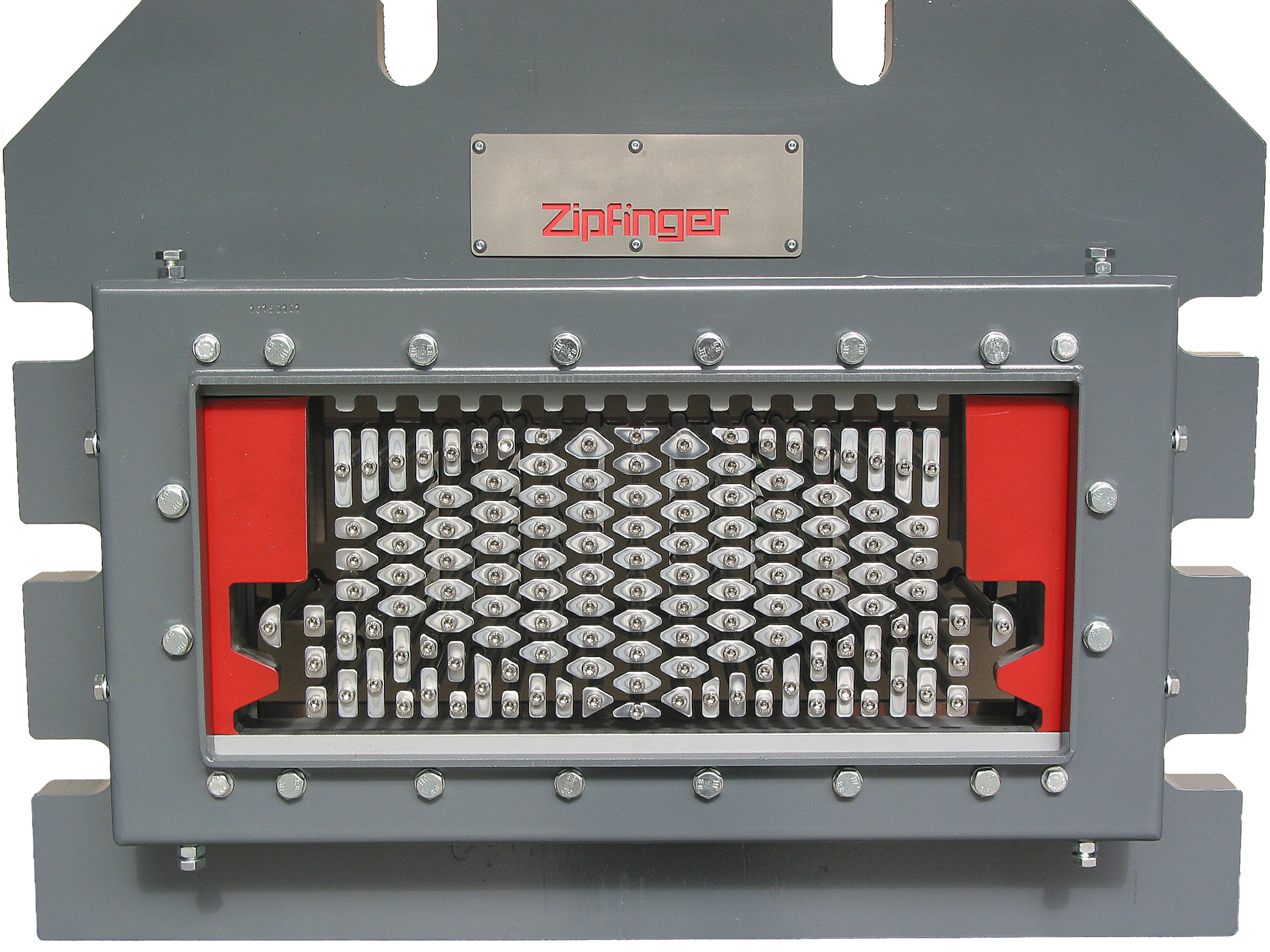
Photograph of an extrusion die tool, illustrating the precision required for manufacturing microforming tooling.

== Tooling and manufacturing challenges ==
A key factor limiting the widespread use of microextrusion is the difficulty of producing and maintaining the required tooling. Dies and rams at the submillimetre scale must be manufactured with tolerances in the micrometre range, which demands high-precision machining, micro-electrodischarge machining, or laser-assisted techniques. Tool wear becomes a significant problem, as the reduced size of the forming surfaces increases the local stress and accelerates material degradation. New approaches such as coating dies with hard films and using ultrafine-grained tool steels are being tested to extend tool life.

Another challenge lies in billet handling and positioning. At such small scales, misalignment of even a few microns can lead to incomplete filling of the die cavity or premature fracture of the workpiece. Automated micro-positioning systems and advanced sensor feedback mechanisms are being developed to improve alignment accuracy. Researchers are also investigating lubrication techniques, since conventional lubricants may not function effectively when the ratio of surface area to volume becomes very large.

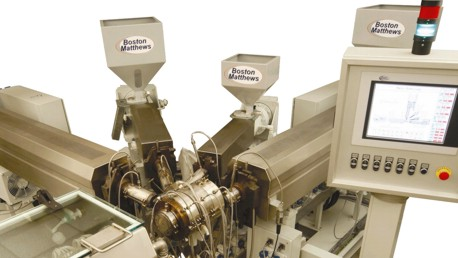
Diagram of multilayer extrusion technology, illustrating the complexity of die design relevant to microextrusion tooling.

Efforts to overcome these tooling and handling difficulties include the integration of microextrusion into larger-scale forming systems, so that billets can be automatically prepared and transferred between stages. This type of hybrid manufacturing setup has been proposed as a way to make the production of microparts more economical for industrial applications.

== Strengths and limitations ==
Strengths of microextrusion over other manufacturing processes include its ability to create very complex cross-sections, preserve chemical properties, condition physical properties, and process materials which are delicate or dependent on physical or chemical properties. However, microextrusion has some limitations, though primarily related to the need for improvement of the relatively young process. Dixit and Das described it thus in 2012:

With the scaling down of dimensions and increasing geometric complexity of objects, currently available technologies and systems may not be able to meet the development needs. New measuring devices, principles and instrumentation, tolerance rules, and procedures have to be developed. Materials databases with detailed information on various materials and their properties/interface properties including microstructures and size effect would be very useful for product innovation and process design. More studies are necessary on micro/nanowear and damages/failures of the micromanufacturing tools. The forming limits for different types of materials at the microlevel must be prescribed. More specific considerations must be incorporated into the design of machines that are scaled down for microforming to meet engineering applications and requirements.

== Applications ==
Microextrusion has been applied across several industries beyond its original focus on metallic microparts. In the medical sector, polymer microextrusion enables the production of microtubing for catheters, stents, and drug delivery systems, with diameters as small as 0.1 millimetres and wall thicknesses below 0.05 millimetres. Microextruded bioresorbable polymers are also used in controlled drug release implants and temporary scaffolds for tissue engineering.

In microelectronics, metallic microextrusion is used to create connectors, pins, and micro-gear shafts with tight tolerances. Microextruded copper and aluminium conductors are being studied for use in miniaturized heat exchangers and microchannel cooling devices.

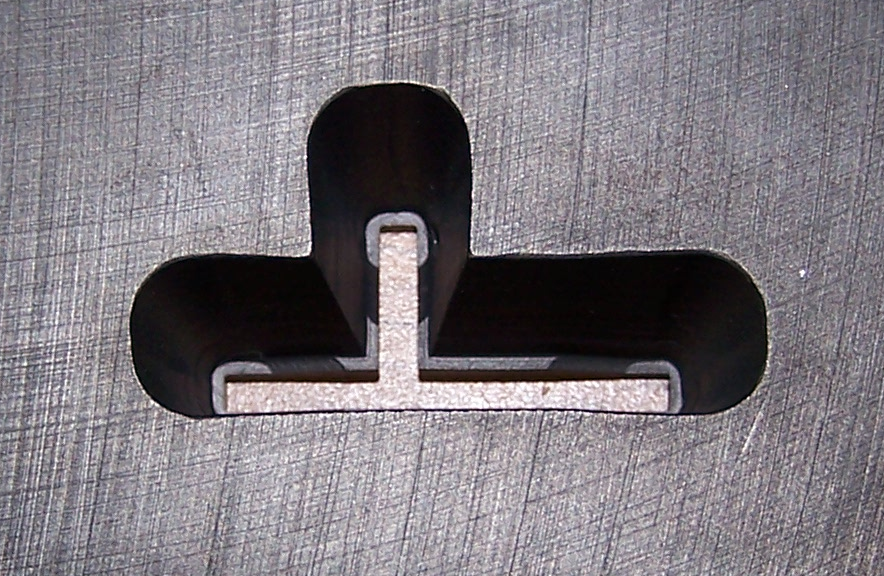
Close-up of extrusion die profile, showing wall geometry and draft angles—useful for illustrating the exacting tolerances required in micro-scale tooling.

In microfluidics, extrusion of polymers into submillimetre channels enables "lab-on-a-chip" systems for biomedical analysis. Additive microextrusion (μE-3DP) has further extended the technique to three-dimensional fabrication of sensors, micro-lattices, and biomedical scaffolds.

== Recent research and emerging techniques ==
Several experimental approaches have been developed to improve the feasibility of bulk microextrusion manufacturing. Ultrasonic vibration-assisted microextrusion has been shown to reduce forming loads and improve surface finish by lowering interfacial friction. Superplastic microextrusion, in which billets are heated into the superplastic regime, allows the creation of complex micro-parts with minimal defects.

Finite element simulations have become a powerful tool for predicting material flow, grain refinement, and defect formation at micro scales. Researchers have also explored the use of hybrid processes, combining microextrusion with microinjection molding or electrospinning, to fabricate multi-material microstructures.
