= LOCOS =

Typical LOCOS structure. 1) silicon 2) silicon dioxide

LOCOS, short for local oxidation of silicon, is a microfabrication process where silicon dioxide is formed in selected areas on a silicon wafer having the Si-SiO_{2} interface at a lower point than the rest of the silicon surface. As of 2008 it was largely superseded by shallow trench isolation.

This technology was developed to insulate MOS transistors from each other and limit transistor cross-talk. The main goal is to create a silicon oxide insulating structure that penetrates under the surface of the wafer, so that the Si-SiO_{2} interface occurs at a lower point than the rest of the silicon surface. This cannot be easily achieved by etching field oxide. Thermal oxidation of selected regions surrounding transistors is used instead. The oxygen penetrates in depth of the wafer, reacts with silicon and transforms it into silicon oxide. In this way, an immersed structure is formed. For process design and analysis purposes, the oxidation of silicon surfaces can be modeled effectively using the Deal–Grove model.

== See also ==
- Shallow trench isolation
