= Element Six =

Manufacturer

- Type: Privately held company
- Industry: Design, development, and production of synthetic diamond and tungsten carbide supermaterials.
- Founded: 1946
- Founder: Ernest Oppenheimer
- Headquarters: London
- Area served: Worldwide
- Key people: Bruce Cleaver, Chairman Siobhán Duffy, Chief Executive Officer Erica Leathers, Chief Financial Officer Dr Daniel Twitchen, Executive Director - Bus Dev & Technologies Sales Dr Iain Goudemond, Executive Director – Operations Emma Williams, Executive Director, HR & Communications
- Products: Industrial diamond, boron nitride, carbide, tungsten carbide, cemented carbide, ceramics, cutting tools, cutting tool material, thermal management, electronics cooling, poly diamond powder, wastewater treatment, quantum technology, synthetic diamond, chemical vapor deposition, synthetic polycrystalline diamond, polycrystalline cubic boron nitride
- Services: Development of advanced engineering industrial and technology material solutions
- Revenue: ▲US $0.5 billion (2011)
- Owners: Umicore, De Beers
- Number of employees: Over 1,900
- Website: www.e6.com

Element Six is a company specialised in providing synthetic diamond, cubic boron nitride and other superhard materials for industrial use. Part of the De Beers Group, Element Six employs over 1,900 people and its primary manufacturing sites are located in the UK, Ireland, Germany, South Africa, and the US. Until rebranding in 2002, it was known as De Beers Industrial Diamonds.

Element Six advanced engineering materials are used in abrasive applications such as cutting, grinding, drilling, shearing and polishing, while the extreme properties of synthetic diamond beyond hardness are applied in a wide array of industrial and technology applications such as optics, power transmission, water treatment, semi-conductors, sensors and quantum information processing.

== History ==
Sir Ernest Oppenheimer formed Industrial Distributors in 1946, the first entity to focus on the industrial uses of natural diamond.

In 1956 it was decided that De Beers should make a concerted effort to produce synthetic diamond and, in response, a research group, called the Adamant Research Laboratory, was established and housed as a subdivision of the laboratory. Two years later, after intensive research into high-pressure and temperature techniques, a team led by Jan Custers and Henry Dyer produced successful results.

Their success in the synthesis of diamonds was announced to the world in 1959 by Harry Oppenheimer. A full-scale plant to produce synthetic industrial diamonds commercially started operation in Springs, Gauteng, in 1961, followed by a second plant in Shannon, County Clare, in May 1963. These two developments gave birth to the De Beers Industrial Diamonds group.

By the 1960s, the company was offering a range of diamond grit products that was followed by nickel and coated diamond materials plus grinding products based on cubic boron nitride.

The company acquired a manor house in Sunninghill, Berkshire, called Charters in 1975 and used it as a research and technical support centre. Charters was sold in 2002 to a residential developer.

In 1992, breakthroughs in chemical vapour deposition technology opened the opportunity to synthesize diamond films and a new raft of application areas became possible.

The De Beers Industrial Diamond Division acquired the super-abrasive distribution business from company Ernst Winter in Germany in 1996, as well as Winter“s joint ventures in other countries.

A new diamond research laboratory was officially opened in Springs, Gauteng, by South African President Thabo Mbeki on 1 November 2001.

In 2002, the company changed its name to Element Six.

The acquisition of a majority of the shareholding of OJSC "Poltava Diamond Plant", a Ukrainian diamond synthesis plant which produces resin bond synthetic diamond was announced on 3 April 2006.

On 19 April 2006, Element Six opened its first manufacturing site in Asia in Suzhou, China, for the production of specialized type of synthetic diamond for internal use in the manufacturing of polycrystalline products.

Element Six purchased Barat Carbide, the former hard materials group of Boart Longyear in 2007 and expanded its product portfolio to include tungsten carbide parts for soft rock mining tools or as wear parts.

In December 2012, Element Six announced that it has acquired US-based Megadiamond's cutting tool business from Schlumberger to become the largest supplier of abrasive supermaterials for the Automotive and Aerospace sectors.

In 2012, Element Six announced to build a Global Innovation Centre near Oxford in the United Kingdom, which was opened in 2013.

== Products ==
Products offered by Element Six fall into two broad categories: superabrasives and advanced diamond products. The largest part of the company's business today is in superabrasives. These products are based on the hardest materials such as synthetic diamond and cubic boron nitride that are used in a wide range of cutting, grinding and drilling applications range from oil and gas exploration to machine tools, automotive part manufacturing and marble production.

== See also ==
- List of synthetic diamond manufacturers
- Material properties of diamond
