= WD Lab Grown Diamonds =

Synthetic diamonds manufacturer

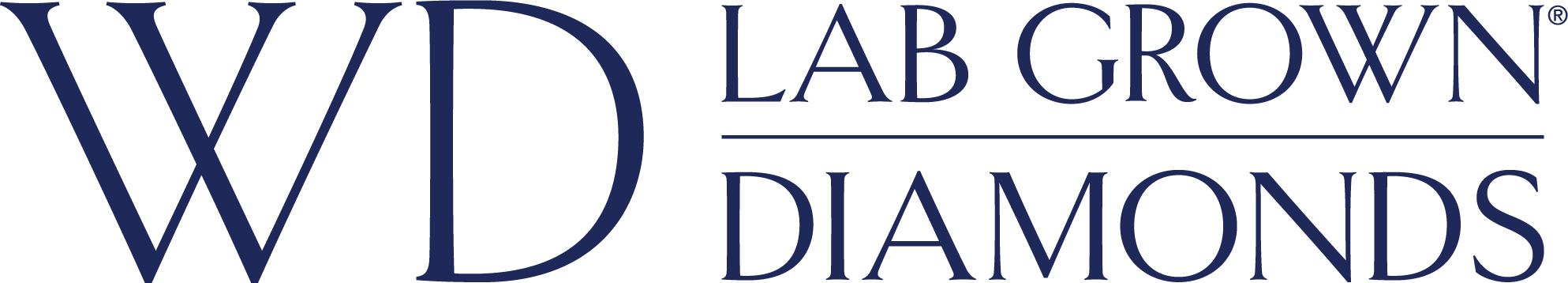
WD Lab Grown Diamonds Logo

WD Lab Grown Diamonds was a manufacturer of synthetic chemical vapor deposition (CVD) diamonds, headquartered in the Washington, D.C. area. Founded in 2008, WD produced lab-grown diamonds for distribution under the brands WD Lab Grown Diamonds and Latitude, in addition to creating diamonds for high-tech Advanced Materials applications. The company formally pivoted and relaunched as WD Advanced Materials, LLC in November 2023.

== Diamond production ==
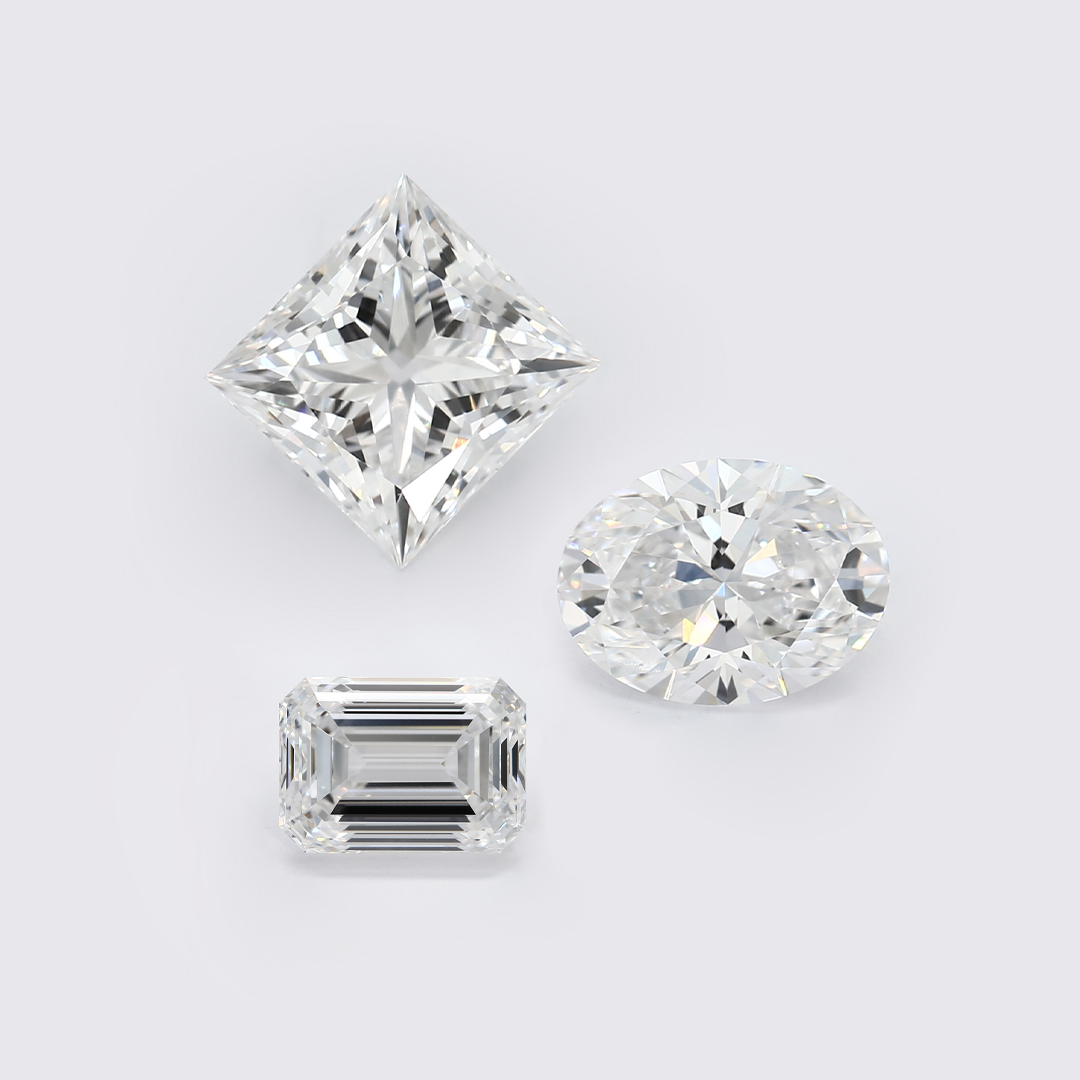
CVD Diamonds grown by WD Lab Grown Diamonds

WD Lab Grown Diamonds employs a proprietary and patented chemical vapor deposition (CVD) process to create laboratory-grown diamonds. WD was an exclusive licensee of patents covering single crystal CVD diamond growth technology that was originally developed by the Geophysical Laboratory of the Carnegie Institution for Science.

WD Lab Grown Diamonds announced its first commercially available diamonds on September 18, 2012. WD Lab Grown Diamonds first 5 carat round brilliant diamond was graded by International Gemological Institute (IGI) on June 1, 2016. On May 22, 2018, WD Lab Grown Diamonds announced that they had produced at 9.04 carat gem-quality diamond (graded as I color VS2 clarity IDEAL cut), eclipsing their previous record of 6 carats (January 2018) and setting a new record for the gem quality lab grown diamond industry. In 2020, WD Lab Grown Diamonds was certified Climate Neutral and achieved the highest-level of third-party Sustainability Rating through SCS Global Services, Inc.

WD Lab Grown Diamonds was focused on the gemstone market, but also serviced the technology sector through their Advanced Materials division, including quantum, semiconductor and optical diamond solutions. WD Lab Grown Diamonds announced in February 2018 that one of its scientific quality 6mm diamond anvils set a record when it was able to withstand 600,000 atmospheres of pressure in a lab study at Oak Ridge National Library.

== History and personnel ==
WD Lab Grown Diamonds was founded in 2008 by Clive Hill, a successful jeweler from the United Kingdom. In January 2019, middle-market private equity firm, Huron Capital completed an equity investment in WD Lab Grown Diamonds. In September 2019, WD Lab Grown Diamonds appointed Sue Rechner as CEO as part of a planned leadership transition. WD was jointly owned by Huron Capital, WD Management, members of its board of directors and the Carnegie Institution for Science. On October 10, 2023, the company filed for Chapter 7 bankruptcy liquidation, announcing a transition to entity WD Advanced Materials, LLC.

== See also ==
- List of synthetic diamond manufacturers
