= Gemesis =

Diamonds company in New York City, US

Gemesis Diamond Company
- Type: Privately held company
- Industry: Synthetic diamonds
- Founded: 1996 (relaunched in 2013 after a 2012 buyout, renamed in 2014)
- Founder: Carter Clarke Jr.
- Headquarters: New York City, United States
- Key people: Lisa Bissell, President and CEO; Jatin Mehta, company buyout purchaser Suraj Mehta, relaunch founder/promoter (son of Jatin Mehta); Gary Coleman, VP of sales
- Products: Synthetic diamonds

Gemesis Inc. was a privately held company located in New York City. The company grew synthetic diamonds using proprietary technology.

Gemesis had the world's largest facilities for both the high-pressure high-temperature (HPHT) and chemical vapor deposition (CVD) diamond production methods. Using these methods, Gemesis produced high-quality colorless and fancy color diamonds that were offered for sale at 20–30% lower prices than mined natural diamonds of similar quality (and, from some suppliers, lower prices than that). By about 2010, Gemesis was the principal producer of gem quality lab created diamonds and jewelry.

Gemesis started marketing its diamonds by cutting and polishing them and then selling them to jewelry retailers on the wholesale market. In 2012, the company began also selling polished diamonds and diamond jewelry directly to consumers through its website.

The company was founded by Carter Clarke Jr., a retired United States Army brigadier general and son of Carter W. Clarke, beginning as a 30,000-square-foot factory, outside Sarasota, Florida. It was purchased in early 2012 by diamond industry businessman Jatin Mehta. After allegations of impropriety among some of the company's principals arose in 2012, the company was restructured and refounded in 2013 with Mehta's son Suraj Mehta at the helm and with part or all of the company assets transferred to a new company that was still known as "Gemesis". A new CEO was appointed and the company was renamed to Pure Grown Diamonds in June 2014. The new company became a diamond reseller that does not manufacture the gems themselves.

== Production process ==
There are two well established methods of synthetic diamond creation – CVD and HPHT. Gemesis used elements of both – growing diamonds by HPHT after creating smaller ones by CVD. This contrasts with the method used by its primary diamond gemstone competitor of the 2000–2010 era, Apollo Diamond, which its grew gemstones using only CVD.

In the HPHT diamond-growing method that was used by Gemesis, carbon, in graphite form, was placed in a cylindrical "core". A tiny CVD seed diamond was placed at the bottom of the cylinder. The graphite was then subjected to extreme pressure, 850,000 lbf/in² (5.9 GPa) and temperature, 3,000 °F (1,650 °C) for four days. As the diamond was grown, the carbon atoms within the molten metal would crystallize on top of the seed diamond. In Gemesis' process, a yellow gem-quality diamond up to 3 carats (600 mg) in size would grow inside the resolidified metal cylinder. The metal cylinder would then be dissolved in mild acid and the diamond crystal would be extracted.

With the addition or elimination of certain impurities under controlled conditions, diamonds of various color types could be produced. Since nitrogen is abundant in the atmosphere, the HPHT process was more likely to produce bright yellow diamonds than any other color (although natural yellow diamonds often have higher value than white diamonds). The yellow tint occurs when approximately five out of each 100,000 carbon atoms in the diamond crystal lattice are replaced with nitrogen atoms.

Available in the purest Type IIa colorless and rare fancy yellow colors, the company's diamonds have identical chemical, optical and physical characteristics as the highest-quality mined diamonds and can also have the same type of cut, color and clarity for gemstone purposes.

== Company history ==
=== 1996–2012 ===
Gemesis was founded in 1996 by Carter Clarke, a retired United States Army brigadier general. In 2006, Stephen D. Lux became its chief executive officer. Lux had substantial prior experience in the diamond industry.

The company announced in November 2010 that it planned to begin offering gemstone-quality colorless diamonds for sale on the internet, and ultimately launched its website to do so in March 2012.

The business was not profitable, partly due to the high cost of developing the diamond production process to a point where sufficient production volume was feasible, and the original investors basically lost their entire investments. The company was heading toward bankruptcy in 2010 when diamond industry businessman Jatin Mehta stepped in with an investment of $US8.4M in exchange for a controlling interest in the firm. Mehta reportedly bought out the remaining shareholders in early 2012 and restructured the company, initially renaming it from Gemesis Corporation to Gemesis Diamond Company. Mehta also moved the company's diamond production operations from Florida to Malaysia and made moves designed to legally separate and protect the company's intellectual property. The company restructuring was sufficiently confusing that the well-known industry analyst Chaim Even-Zohar published a report in May 2012 entitled "The Mystery Of Two Gemesis Companies Under One Hat".

=== 2012 incident involving undisclosed synthetic stones and Lux departure ===
In May 2012, the news emerged that a parcel of 600 unmarked synthetic diamonds had been submitted by a buyer to the International Gemological Institute (IGI) diamond certifying agency for evaluation, without any accompanying disclosure that they were synthetic. The DTC Diamond Research Center issued an alert and said the undisclosed synthetics were "strikingly similar" in their characteristics to Gemesis diamonds, and a trade journal said the synthetics and Gemesis diamonds had "identical characteristics" and "had the specific Gemesis fingerprint". The diamonds had been grown by CVD and then treated by HPHT, and thus their production required both technologies. It was noted that all of the stones in the parcel were synthetics – there was no mixing to hide synthetic stones among natural ones. The buyer of the parcel said the 600 diamonds were only a sampling from a collection that was four or five times larger.

The IGI alleged that impurities and flaws in the synthetic stones had been intentionally introduced in order to create the appearance that they were of natural origin, concluding that the stones had been "created to defraud".

The invoices for the diamonds were traced to a company called Su-Raj Diamonds and Jewelry USA in New York that was co-owned by Jatin Mehta, the majority owner of Gemesis, along with a junior partner named Ashok Bhansali. The same company was reported to house the central inventory of diamonds for Gemesis itself. Stephen Lux responded to the reports by saying "Gemesis can assure the industry with 100 percent certainty that it has not been involved in selling its diamonds as mined, and the undisclosed diamonds referenced in the DTC and IGI alerts are not Gemesis diamonds." Jatin Mehta then reportedly suggested it was possible that Bhansali "had misappropriated stocks held previously by the partnership" or that "some people who had left Gemesis … might have stolen our technology and are thus producing our typical Gemesis characteristic goods", and showed that the Su-Raj parent company (a large publicly listed company based in India and also known as Winsome Diamonds or Jewellery USA) had taken some steps to sever its ties with its New York subsidiary (although the degree to which the separation had taken effect was unclear).

In December 2012, Stephen Lux reportedly resigned from his position as the company's CEO. Lux said that internal issues at the company and "distractions" (speculated to include the reports of undisclosed synthetic diamonds) had recently made it difficult for him to focus on his goals for building the business. However, Lux later sued the company, alleging that he had not actually resigned but rather had been terminated, and claiming wrongful termination of his employment. Lux also alleged that the company had not actually been purchased by Jatin Mehta directly, but instead had been sold to a company named Power Capital Ventures Ltd (PCV) in 2012.

Disputes over the incident lasted until at least 2017, when Su-Raj filed a complaint with the Supreme Court of New York against its broker, Sterling Diamonds, Inc.

=== Milestone achievements 2013–2014 ===
Gemesis created the world's largest lab-created diamond in April 2013, broke that record in November 2013, and then broke the record again in July 2014. The first was a 1.29 carat emerald cut, the second was a princess cut at 1.78 carat, and the third was a 3 carat round brilliant white Type IIa diamond.

=== Rebranding in 2014 ===
In June 2014, Gemesis named a new CEO, Lisa Bissell, and re-branded itself as "Pure Grown Diamonds". At the time, Bissell said "The new name reinforces our commitment to disclosure and transparency." Suraj Mehta said he had been looking for a person to fill the role after re-founding the company in 2013.

In the wake of the company's restructuring, Jeweller magazine reported that "Gemesis' rebranding and its strong emphasis on transparency could be perceived as an effort to dissociate from previous speculation and confusion." It referred to the May 2012 discovery of undisclosed synthetic diamonds and said that past reports from the company had "caused confusion regarding the status of the company's ownership and operations". The company's 2014 press releases referred to the company as having been founded in 2013, although Gemesis had been in existence since 1996.

== Marketing strategy ==
The company highlighted several advantages of its diamonds over those produced by natural processes:

- Lower prices
- Alleviating concerns about the environmental impact of mining
- Alleviating concerns related to the potential purchase of "conflict" or "blood" diamonds

Diamonds over 0.23 carats sold via Gemesis.com were laser inscribed to identify their origin and were certified by industry authorities such as the International Gemological Institute.

== See also ==
- List of synthetic diamond manufacturers
