= List of synthetic diamond manufacturers =

Synthetic diamonds are produced via high pressure, high temperature (HPHT) or chemical vapor deposition (CVD) technology. These diamonds have numerous industrial and commercial uses including cutting tools, thermal conductors and consumer diamond gemstones.

== Gemstone diamond producers ==
- Apollo Diamond (defunct, assets sold in 2011 to Scio Diamond)
- ALTR Created Diamonds
- De Beers (Lightbox)
- Diamond Foundry
- Gemesis (now a non-producing reseller called Pure Grown Diamonds)
- Scio Diamond Technology Corporation (colorless)
- Tairus
- WD Lab Grown Diamonds
- Veynou, German jewellery brand founded in 2021.
- Vera Bijou
- Huanghe Whirlwind
- Liliang Diamond

== Industrial diamonds ==
- Element Six
- Hyperion Materials & Technologies
- Morgan Technical Ceramics (as "Diamonex")
- Scio Diamond Technology Corporation
- Sumitomo Electric Industries
