= Material properties of diamond =

Diamond
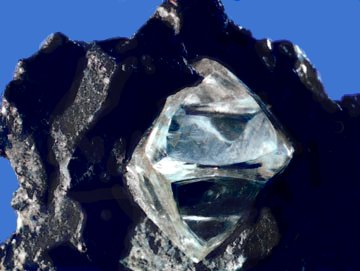
- An octahedral diamond crystal in matrix

General
- Category: Native nonmetal
- Formula: Carbon (C)
- Crystal system: Diamond cubic (a = 3.56683 Å)

Identification
- Color: Most often colorless yellow or brown; rarely pink, orange, green, blue, gray, or red
- Crystal habit: Octahedral, cubo-octahedral, spherical, or cubic
- Cleavage: Perfect; parallel to the octahedral face
- Fracture: Irregular
- Mohs scale hardness: 10
- Streak: white
- Diaphaneity: Clear to not
- Specific gravity: 3.516–3.525
- Refractive index: 2.417
- Pleochroism: None
- Fusibility: Burns above 700 °C in air.
- Solubility: Resistant to acids, but dissolves irreversibly in hot steel
- Other characteristics: boiling point = none, very low vapor pressure before decomposing in solid state

Major varieties
- Ballas: Spherical, radial structure, cryptocrystalline, opaque black
- Bort: Poorly formed, cryptocrystalline, shapeless, translucent
- Carbonado: Massive, microcrystalline, opaque black

Diamond is the allotrope of carbon in which the carbon atoms are arranged in the specific type of cubic lattice called diamond cubic. It is a crystal that is transparent to opaque and which is generally isotropic (no or very weak birefringence). Diamond is the hardest naturally occurring material known. Yet, due to important structural brittleness, bulk diamond's toughness is only fair to good. The precise tensile strength of bulk diamond is little known; however, compressive strength up to 60 GPa has been observed, and it could be as high as 90–100 GPa in the form of micro/nanometer-sized wires or needles (~100–300 nm in diameter, micrometers long), with a corresponding maximum tensile elastic strain in excess of 9%. The anisotropy of diamond hardness is carefully considered during diamond cutting. Diamond has a high refractive index (2.417) and moderate dispersion (0.044) properties that give cut diamonds their brilliance. Scientists classify diamonds into four main types according to the nature of crystallographic defects present. Trace impurities substitutionally replacing carbon atoms in a diamond's crystal structure, and in some cases structural defects, are responsible for the wide range of colors seen in diamond. Most diamonds are electrical insulators and extremely efficient thermal conductors. Unlike many other minerals, the specific gravity of diamond crystals (3.52) has rather small variation from diamond to diamond.

== Hardness and crystal structure ==
Known to the ancient Greeks as ἀδάμας (adámas, 'proper, unalterable, unbreakable') and sometimes called adamant, diamond is the hardest known naturally occurring material, and serves as the definition of 10 on the Mohs scale of mineral hardness. Diamond is extremely strong owing to its crystal structure, known as diamond cubic, in which each carbon atom has four neighbors covalently bonded to it. Bulk cubic boron nitride (c-BN) is nearly as hard as diamond. Diamond reacts with some materials, such as steel, and c-BN wears less when cutting or abrading such material. (Its zincblende structure is like the diamond cubic structure, but with alternating types of atoms.) A currently hypothetical material, beta carbon nitride (β-C_{3}N_{4}), may also be as hard or harder in one form. It has been shown that some diamond aggregates having nanometer grain size are harder and tougher than conventional large diamond crystals, thus they perform better as abrasive material. Owing to the use of those new ultra-hard materials for diamond testing, more accurate values are now known for diamond hardness. A surface perpendicular to the [111] crystallographic direction (that is the longest diagonal of a cube) of a pure (i.e., type IIa) diamond has a hardness value of 167 GPa when scratched with a nanodiamond tip, while the nanodiamond sample itself has a value of 310 GPa when tested with another nanodiamond tip. Because the test only works properly with a tip made of harder material than the sample being tested, the true value for nanodiamond is likely somewhat lower than 310 GPa.

Visualisation of a diamond cubic unit cell: 1. Components of a unit cell, 2. One unit cell, 3. A lattice of 3×3×3 unit cells

Molar volume vs. pressure at room temperature.

3D ball-and-stick model of a diamond lattice

The precise tensile strength of diamond is unknown, though strength up to 60 GPa has been observed, and theoretically it could be as high as 90–225 GPa depending on the sample volume/size, the perfection of diamond lattice and on its orientation: Tensile strength is the highest for the [100] crystal direction (normal to the cubic face), smaller for the [110] and the smallest for the [111] axis (along the longest cube diagonal). Diamond also has one of the smallest compressibilities of any material.

Cubic diamonds have a perfect and easy octahedral cleavage, which means that they only have four planes—weak directions following the faces of the octahedron where there are fewer bonds—along which diamond can easily split upon blunt impact to leave a smooth surface. Similarly, diamond's hardness is markedly directional: the hardest direction is the diagonal on the cube face, 100 times harder than the softest direction, which is the dodecahedral plane. The octahedral plane is intermediate between the two extremes. The diamond cutting process relies heavily on this directional hardness, as without it a diamond would be nearly impossible to fashion. Cleavage also plays a helpful role, especially in large stones where the cutter wishes to remove flawed material or to produce more than one stone from the same piece of rough (e.g. Cullinan Diamond).

Diamonds crystallize in the diamond cubic crystal system (space group Fd3̅m) and consist of tetrahedrally, covalently bonded carbon atoms. A second form called lonsdaleite, with hexagonal symmetry, has also been found, but it is extremely rare and forms only in meteorites or in laboratory synthesis. The local environment of each atom is identical in the two structures. From theoretical considerations, lonsdaleite is expected to be harder than diamond, but the size and quality of the available stones are insufficient to test this hypothesis. In terms of crystal habit, diamonds occur most often as euhedral (well-formed) or rounded octahedra and twinned, flattened octahedra with a triangular outline. Other forms include dodecahedra and (rarely) cubes. There is evidence that nitrogen impurities play an important role in the formation of well-shaped euhedral crystals. The largest diamonds found, such as the Cullinan Diamond, were shapeless. These diamonds are pure (i.e. type II) and therefore contain little if any nitrogen.

The faces of diamond octahedrons are highly lustrous owing to their hardness; triangular shaped growth defects (trigons) or etch pits are often present on the faces. A diamond's fracture is irregular. Diamonds which are nearly round, due to the formation of multiple steps on octahedral faces, are commonly coated in a gum-like skin (nyf). The combination of stepped faces, growth defects, and nyf produces a "scaly" or corrugated appearance. Many diamonds are so distorted that few crystal faces are discernible. Some diamonds found in Brazil and the Democratic Republic of the Congo are polycrystalline and occur as opaque, darkly colored, spherical, radial masses of tiny crystals; these are known as ballas and are important to industry as they lack the cleavage planes of single-crystal diamond. Carbonado is a similar opaque microcrystalline form which occurs in shapeless masses. Like ballas diamond, carbonado lacks cleavage planes and its specific gravity varies widely from 2.9 to 3.5. Bort diamonds, found in Brazil, Venezuela, and Guyana, are the most common type of industrial-grade diamond. They are also polycrystalline and often poorly crystallized; they are translucent and cleave easily.

=== Hydrophobia and lipophilia ===
Due to great hardness and strong molecular bonding, a cut diamond's facets and facet edges appear the flattest and sharpest. A curious side effect of a natural diamond's surface perfection is hydrophobia combined with lipophilia. The former property means a drop of water placed on a diamond forms a coherent droplet, whereas in most other minerals the water would spread out to cover the surface. Additionally, diamond is unusually lipophilic, meaning grease and oil readily collect and spread on a diamond's surface, whereas in other minerals oil would form coherent drops. This property is exploited in the use of grease pencils, which apply a line of grease to the surface of a suspect diamond simulant. Diamond surfaces are hydrophobic when the surface carbon atoms terminate with a hydrogen atom and hydrophilic when the surface atoms terminate with an oxygen atom or hydroxyl radical. Treatment with gases or plasmas containing the appropriate gas, at temperatures of 450 °C or higher, can change the surface property completely. Naturally occurring diamonds have a surface with less than a half monolayer coverage of oxygen, the balance being hydrogen and the behavior is moderately hydrophobic. This allows for separation from other minerals at the mine using the so-called "grease-belt".

== Toughness ==
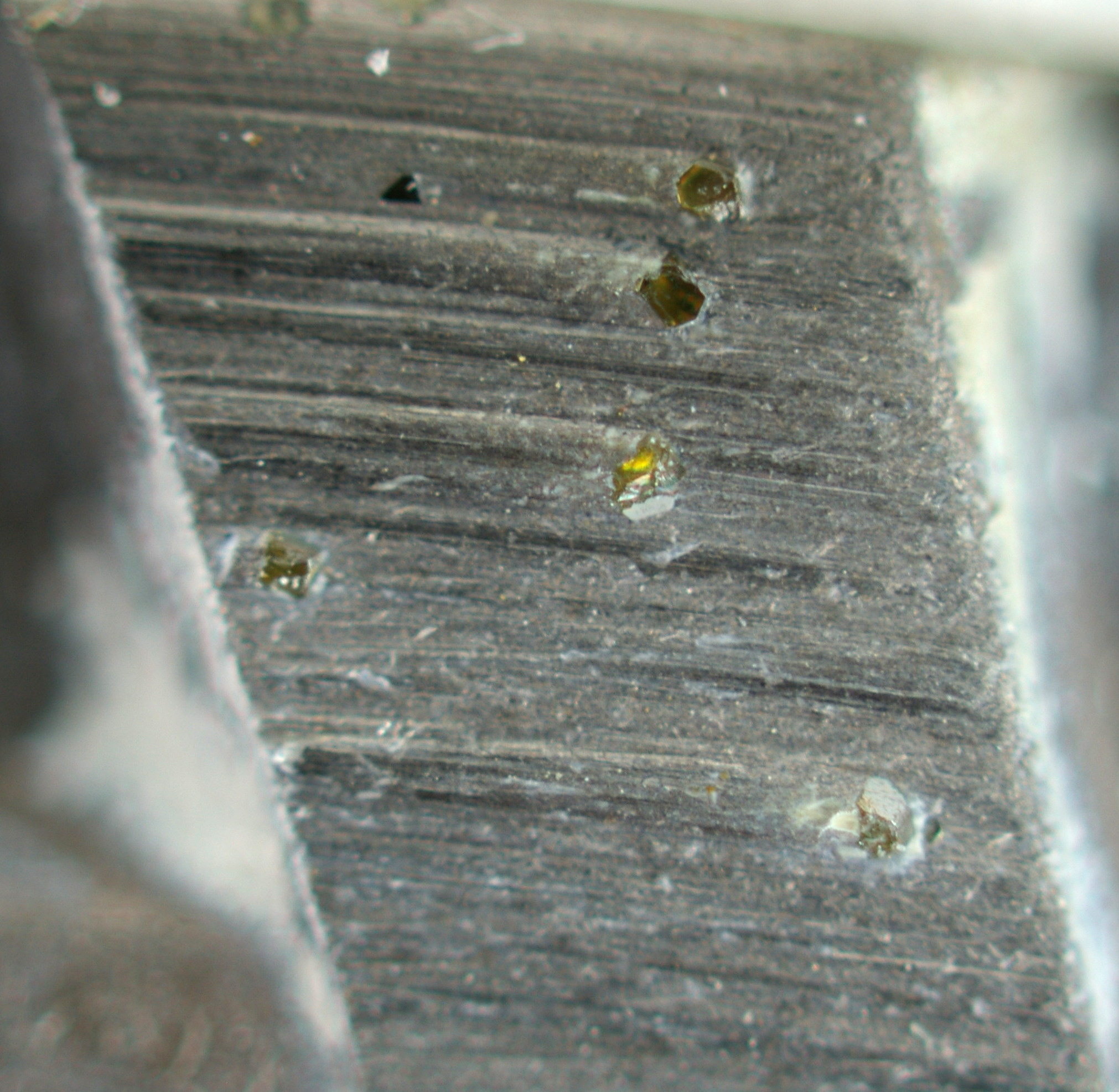
Diamonds in an angle grinder blade

Unlike hardness, which denotes only resistance to scratching, diamond's toughness or tenacity is only fair to good. Toughness relates to the ability to resist breakage from falls or impacts. Because of diamond's perfect and easy cleavage, it is vulnerable to breakage. A diamond will shatter if hit with an ordinary hammer. The toughness of natural diamond has been measured as 2.0 MPa⋅m^{1/2}, which is good compared to other gemstones like aquamarine (blue colored), but poor compared to most engineering materials. As with any material, the macroscopic geometry of a diamond contributes to its resistance to breakage. Diamond has a cleavage plane and is therefore more fragile in some orientations than others. Diamond cutters use this attribute to cleave some stones, prior to faceting.

Ballas and carbonado diamond are exceptional, as they are polycrystalline and therefore much tougher than single-crystal diamond; they are used for deep-drilling bits and other demanding industrial applications. Particular faceting shapes of diamonds are more prone to breakage and thus may be uninsurable by reputable insurance companies. The brilliant cut of gemstones is designed specifically to reduce the likelihood of breakage or splintering.

Solid foreign crystals are commonly present in diamond. They are mostly minerals, such as olivine, garnets, ruby, and many others. These and other inclusions, such as internal fractures or "feathers", can compromise the structural integrity of a diamond. Cut diamonds that have been enhanced to improve their clarity via glass infilling of fractures or cavities are especially fragile, as the glass will not stand up to ultrasonic cleaning or the rigors of the jeweler's torch. Fracture-filled diamonds may shatter if treated improperly.

=== Pressure resistance ===
Used in so-called diamond anvil experiments to create high-pressure environments, diamonds withstand crushing pressures in excess of 600 gigapascals (6 million atmospheres).

== Optical properties ==
=== Color and its causes ===
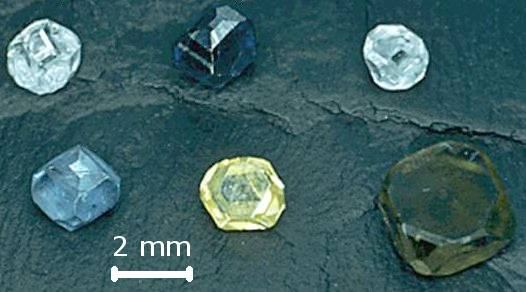
Synthetic diamonds of various colors grown by the high-pressure high-temperature technique. The diamond size is ~2 mm.

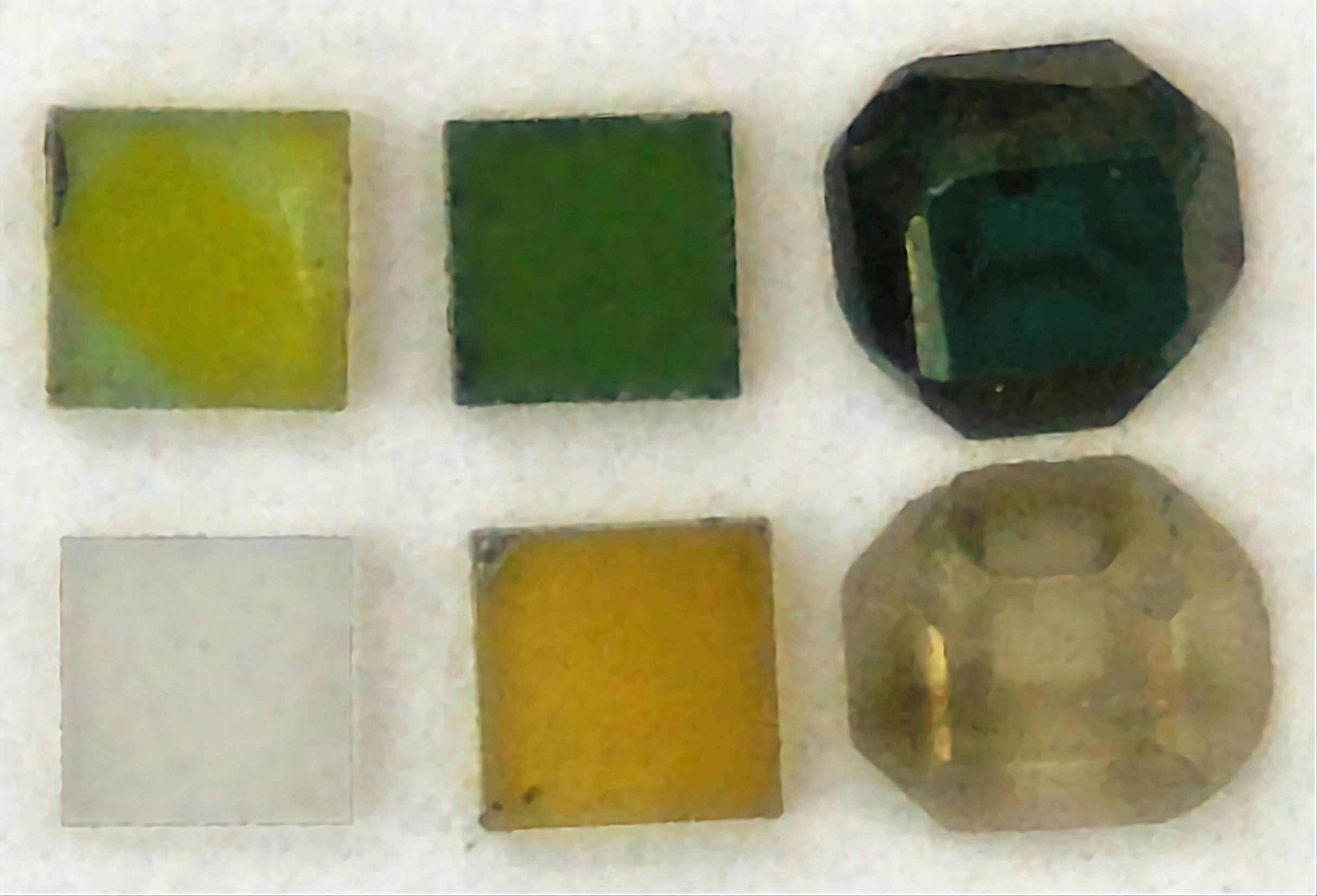
Pure diamonds, before and after irradiation and annealing. Clockwise from left bottom: 1) initial (2 mm × 2 mm); 2–4) irradiated by different doses of 2 MeV electrons; 5–6) irradiated by different doses and annealed at 800 °C.

Diamonds occur in various colors: black, brown, yellow, gray, white, blue, orange, purple to pink, and red. Colored diamonds contain crystallographic defects, including substitutional impurities and structural defects, that cause the coloration. Theoretically, pure diamonds would be transparent and colorless. Diamonds are scientifically classed into two main types and several subtypes, according to the nature of defects present and how they affect light absorption:

Type I diamond has nitrogen (N) atoms as the main impurity, at a concentration of up to 1%. If the N atoms are in pairs or larger aggregates, they do not affect the diamond's color; these are Type Ia. About 98% of gem diamonds are type Ia: these diamonds belong to the Cape series, named after the diamond-rich region formerly known as Cape Province in South Africa, whose deposits are largely Type Ia. If the nitrogen atoms are dispersed throughout the crystal in isolated sites (not paired or grouped), they give the stone an intense yellow or occasionally brown tint (type Ib); the rare canary diamonds belong to this type, which represents only ~0.1% of known natural diamonds. Synthetic diamond containing nitrogen is usually of type Ib. Type Ia and Ib diamonds absorb in both the infrared and ultraviolet region of the electromagnetic spectrum, from 320 nm. They also have a characteristic fluorescence and visible absorption spectrum.

Type II diamonds have very few if any nitrogen impurities. Pure (type IIa) diamond can be colored pink, red, or, brown owing to structural anomalies arising through plastic deformation during crystal growth; these diamonds are rare (1.8% of gem diamonds), but constitute a large percentage of Australian diamonds. Type IIb diamonds, which account for ~0.1% of gem diamonds, are usually a steely blue or gray due to boron atoms scattered within the crystal matrix. These diamonds are also semiconductors, unlike other diamond types (see Electrical properties). Most blue-gray diamonds coming from the Argyle mine of Australia are not of type IIb, but of Ia type. Those diamonds contain large concentrations of defects and impurities (especially hydrogen and nitrogen) and the origin of their color is yet uncertain. Type II diamonds weakly absorb in a different region of the infrared (the absorption is due to the diamond lattice rather than impurities), and transmit in the ultraviolet below 225 nm, unlike type I diamonds. They also have differing fluorescence characteristics, but no discernible visible absorption spectrum.

Certain diamond enhancement techniques are commonly used to artificially produce an array of colors, including blue, green, yellow, red, and black. Color enhancement techniques usually involve irradiation, including proton bombardment via cyclotrons; neutron bombardment in the piles of nuclear reactors; and electron bombardment by Van de Graaff generators. These high-energy particles physically alter the diamond's crystal lattice, knocking carbon atoms out of place and producing color centers. The depth of color penetration depends on the technique and its duration, and in some cases the diamond may be left radioactive to some degree.

Some irradiated diamonds are completely natural; one famous example is the Dresden Green Diamond. In these natural stones the color is imparted by "radiation burns" (natural irradiation by alpha particles originating from uranium ore) in the form of small patches, usually only micrometers deep. Additionally, Type IIa diamonds can have their structural deformations "repaired" via a high-pressure high-temperature (HPHT) process, removing much or all of the diamond's color.

=== Luster ===
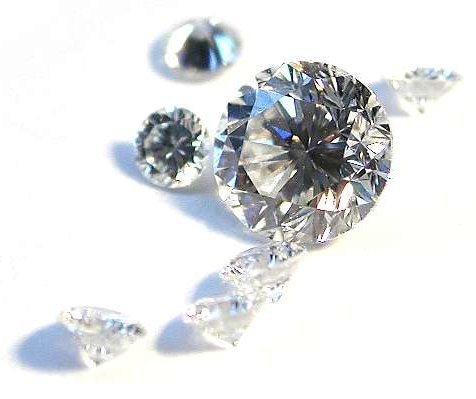
A scattering of round-brilliant cut diamonds shows the many reflecting facets.

The luster of a diamond is described as "adamantine", which simply means diamond-like. Reflections on a properly cut diamond's facets are undistorted, due to their flatness. The refractive index of diamond (as measured via sodium light, 589.3 nm) is 2.417. Because it is cubic in structure, diamond is also isotropic. Its high dispersion of 0.044 (variation of refractive index across the visible spectrum) manifests in the perceptible fire of cut diamonds. This fire—flashes of prismatic colors seen in transparent stones—is perhaps diamond's most important optical property from a jewelry perspective. The prominence or amount of fire seen in a stone is heavily influenced by the choice of diamond cut and its associated proportions (particularly crown height), although the body color of fancy (i.e., unusual) diamonds may hide their fire to some degree.

More than 20 other minerals have higher dispersion (that is difference in refractive index for blue and red light) than diamond, such as titanite 0.051, andradite 0.057, cassiterite 0.071, strontium titanate 0.109, sphalerite 0.156, synthetic rutile 0.330, cinnabar 0.4, etc. (see Dispersion (optics)). However, the combination of dispersion with extreme hardness, wear and chemical resistivity, as well as clever marketing, determines the exceptional value of diamond as a gemstone.

=== Fluorescence ===
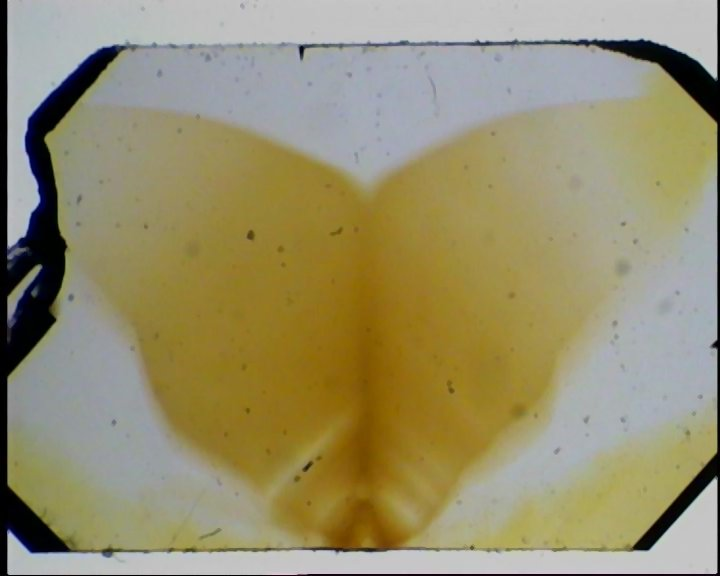

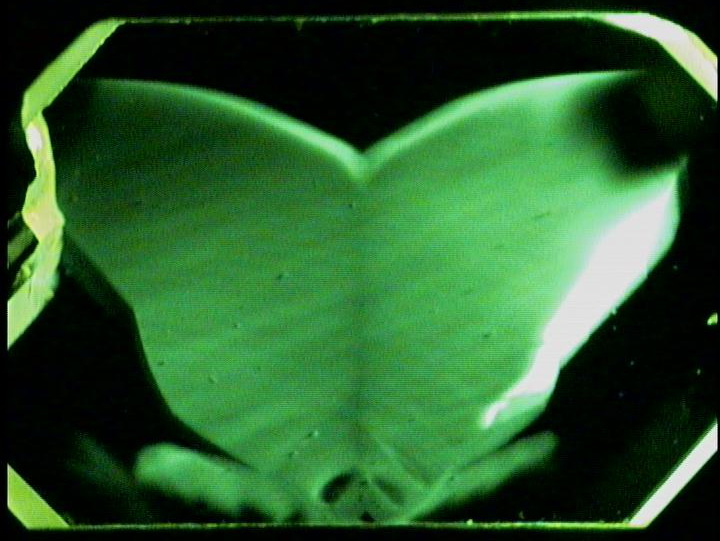
A photograph (top) and UV-excited photoluminescence image (bottom) from a plate cut from a synthetic diamond (width ~3 mm). Most of yellow color and green emission originate from nickel impurities.

Diamonds exhibit fluorescence, that is, they emit light of various colors and intensities under long-wave ultraviolet light (365 nm): Cape series stones (type Ia) usually fluoresce blue, and these stones may also phosphoresce yellow, a unique property among gemstones. Other possible long-wave fluorescence colors are green (usually in brown stones), yellow, mauve, or red (in type IIb diamonds). In natural diamonds, there is typically little if any response to short-wave ultraviolet, but the reverse is true of synthetic diamonds. Some natural type IIb diamonds phosphoresce blue after exposure to short-wave ultraviolet. In natural diamonds, fluorescence under X-rays is generally bluish-white, yellowish or greenish. Some diamonds, particularly Canadian diamonds, show no fluorescence.

The origin of the luminescence colors is often unclear and not unique. Blue emission from type IIa and IIb diamonds is reliably identified with dislocations by directly correlating the emission with dislocations in an electron microscope. However, blue emission in type Ia diamond could be either due to dislocations or the N3 defects (three nitrogen atoms bordering a vacancy). Green emission in natural diamond is usually due to the H3 center (two substitutional nitrogen atoms separated by a vacancy), whereas in synthetic diamond it usually originates from nickel used as a catalyst (see figure). Orange or red emission could be due to various reasons, one being the nitrogen-vacancy center which is present in sufficient quantities in all types of diamond, even type IIb.

=== Optical absorption ===
Cape series (Ia) diamonds have a visible absorption spectrum (as seen through a direct-vision spectroscope) consisting of a fine line in the violet at 415.5 nm; however, this line is often invisible until the diamond has been cooled to very low temperatures. Associated with this are weaker lines at 478 nm, 465 nm, 452 nm, 435 nm, and 423 nm. All those lines are labeled as N3 and N2 optical centers and associated with a defect consisting of three nitrogen atoms bordering a vacancy. Other stones show additional bands: brown, green, or yellow diamonds show a band in the green at 504 nm (H3 center, see above), sometimes accompanied by two additional weak bands at 537 nm and 495 nm (H4 center, a large complex presumably involving 4 substitutional nitrogen atoms and 2 lattice vacancies). Type IIb diamonds may absorb in the far red due to the substitutional boron, but otherwise show no observable visible absorption spectrum.

Gemological laboratories make use of spectrophotometer machines that can distinguish natural, artificial, and color-enhanced diamonds. The spectrophotometers analyze the infrared, visible, and ultraviolet absorption and luminescence spectra of diamonds cooled with liquid nitrogen to detect tell-tale absorption lines that are not normally discernible.

== Electrical properties ==
Diamond is a good electrical insulator, having a resistivity of 100 GΩ⋅m to 1 EΩ⋅m (1.0×10^{11} – 1.0×10^{18} Ω⋅m), and is famous for its wide bandgap of 5.47 eV. High carrier mobilities and high electric breakdown field at room temperature are also important characteristics of diamond. Those characteristics allow single crystalline diamond to be one of the promising materials for semiconductors. A wide bandgap is advantageous in semiconductors because it allows them to maintain high resistivity even at high temperature, important for high power applications. Semiconductors whose carrier mobilities are high such as diamond are easier to utilize in industry because they do not need high input voltage. High breakdown voltage avoids a huge current suddenly occurring at typical input voltages.

Most natural blue diamonds are an exception and are semiconductors due to substitutional boron impurities replacing carbon atoms. Natural blue or blue-gray diamonds, common for the Argyle diamond mine in Australia, are rich in hydrogen; these diamonds are not semiconductors and it is unclear whether hydrogen is actually responsible for their blue-gray color. Natural blue diamonds containing boron and synthetic diamonds doped with boron are p-type semiconductors. N-type diamond films are reproducibly synthesized by phosphorus doping during chemical vapor deposition. Diode p-n junctions and UV light emitting diodes (LEDs, at 235 nm) have been produced by sequential deposition of p-type (boron-doped) and n-type (phosphorus-doped) layers. Diamond's electronic properties can be also modulated by strain engineering.

Diamond transistors have been produced (for research purposes). In January 2024, a Japanese research team fabricated a MOSFET using phosphorus-doped n-type diamond, which would have superior characteristics to silicon-based technology in high-temperature, high-frequency or high-electron mobility applications. FETs with SiN dielectric layers, and SC-FETs have been made.

In April 2004, research published in the journal Nature reported that below 4 K, synthetic boron-doped diamond is a bulk superconductor. Superconductivity was later observed in heavily boron-doped films grown by various chemical vapor deposition techniques, and the highest reported transition temperature (by 2009) is 11.4 K. (See also Covalent superconductors)

Uncommon magnetic properties (spin glass state) were observed in diamond nanocrystals intercalated with potassium. Unlike paramagnetic host material, magnetic susceptibility measurements of intercalated nanodiamond revealed distinct ferromagnetic behavior at 5 K. This is essentially different from results of potassium intercalation in graphite or C60 fullerene, and shows that sp3 bonding promotes magnetic ordering in carbon. The measurements presented first experimental evidence of intercalation-induced spin-glass state in a nanocrystalline diamond system.

== Thermal conductivity ==
Unlike most electrical insulators, diamond is a good conductor of heat because of covalent bonding. Thermal conductivity of natural diamond was measured to be about 2,200 W/(m·K), which is five times more than silver, the most thermally conductive metal. Monocrystalline synthetic diamond enriched to 99.9% the isotope ^{12}C had the highest thermal conductivity of any known solid at room temperature: 3,320 W/(m·K), though reports exist of superior thermal conductivity in both carbon nanotubes and graphene. Because diamond has such high thermal conductance it is already used in semiconductor manufacture to prevent silicon and other semiconducting materials from overheating. At lower temperatures conductivity becomes even better, and reaches 41,000 W/(m·K) at 104 K (−169 °C; −272 °F) (^{12}C-enriched diamond).

Diamond's high thermal conductivity is used by jewelers and gemologists who may employ an electronic thermal probe to distinguish diamonds from their imitations. These probes consist of a pair of battery-powered thermistors mounted in a fine copper tip. One thermistor functions as a heating device while the other measures the temperature of the copper tip: if the stone being tested is a diamond, it will conduct the tip's thermal energy rapidly enough to produce a measurable temperature drop. This test takes about 2–3 seconds. However, older probes will be fooled by moissanite, a crystalline mineral form of silicon carbide introduced in 1998 as an alternative to diamonds, which has a similar thermal conductivity.

Technologically, the high thermal conductivity of diamond is used for the efficient heat removal in high-end power electronics. Diamond is especially appealing in situations where electrical conductivity of the heat sinking material cannot be tolerated e.g. for the thermal management of high-power radio-frequency (RF) microcoils that are used to produce strong and local RF fields.

== Thermal stability ==
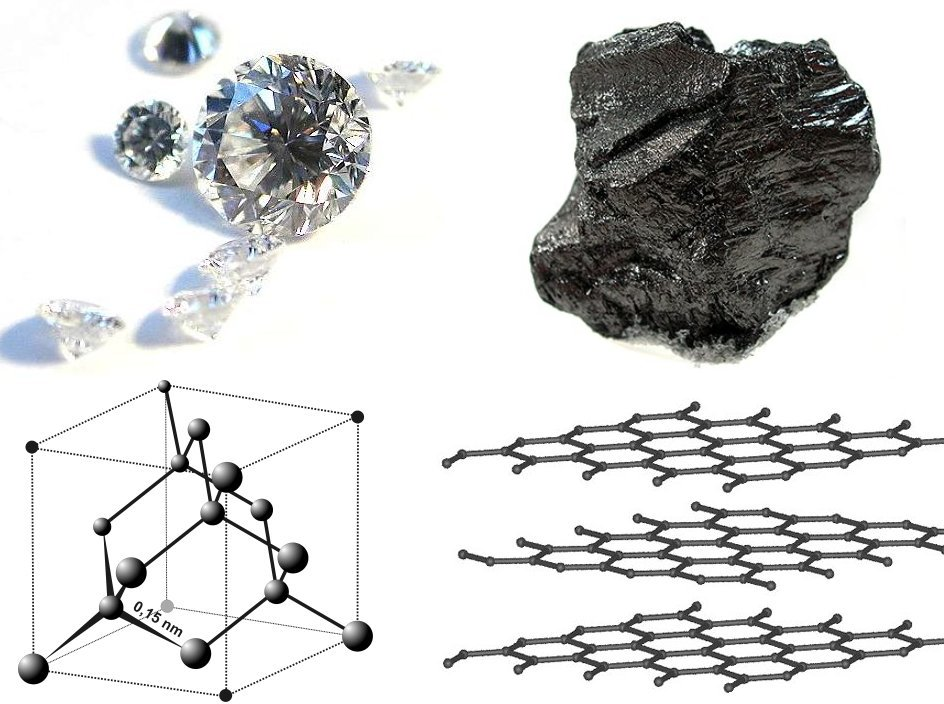
Diamond and graphite are two allotropes of carbon: pure forms of the same element that differ in structure.

If heated over 700 °C (1,292 °F) in air, diamond, being a form of carbon, oxidizes and its surface blackens, but the surface can be restored by re-polishing. In absence of oxygen, e.g. in a flow of high-purity argon gas, diamond can be heated up to about 1700 °C. At high pressure (~20 GPa (2,900,000 psi)) diamond can be heated up to 2,500 °C (4,530 °F), and a report published in 2009 suggests that diamond can withstand temperatures of 3,000 °C (5,430 °F) and above.

Diamonds are carbon crystals that form under high temperatures and extreme pressures such as deep within the Earth. At surface air pressure (one atmosphere), diamonds are not as stable as graphite, and so the decay of diamond is thermodynamically favorable (δH = −2 kJ/mol). However, owing to a very large kinetic energy barrier, diamonds are metastable; they will not decay into graphite under normal conditions.

== See also ==
- Chemical vapor deposition of diamond
- Crystallographic defects in diamond
- Nitrogen-vacancy center
