= Carter W. Clarke =

United States Army general (1896–1987)

- Born: September 20, 1896; Smithland, Kentucky, U.S.
- Died: September 2, 1987 (aged 90); Clearwater, Florida, U.S.
- Burial place: Arlington National Cemetery
- Spouse: Jessie Fuller Clarke
- Military career
- Allegiance: United States of America
- Branch: United States Army
- Service years: 1916–1954
- Rank: Brigadier General
- Commands: Venona project
- Conflicts: World War I World War II; Korean War

Carter Weldon Clarke (September 20, 1896 – September 3, 1987) was a US Army intelligence officer and brigadier general who was the military intelligence officer who prepared intercepted Japanese Magic cables for US officials. He also headed a War Department investigation into the role that military intelligence played before the Japanese attack on Pearl Harbor.

Clarke joined the army in 1916, the year prior to US entry into World War I. In his work for the Military Intelligence Division, he was instrumental in 1943 in starting the Venona project. In 1944, he ignored a request initiated by Eleanor Roosevelt to cease the project.

During the Korean War, he commanded forces in Osaka, Japan. Late in his career, he also worked as an assistant to Allen W. Dulles, who was Director of Central Intelligence. Clarke retired in 1954.

In a 1959 interview, Clarke said that he disagreed with the decision to drop atomic bombings on Japan at the end of World War II and believed it had been unnecessary since Japan was "down to an abject surrender through the accelerated sinking of their merchant marine and hunger alone, and when we didn't need to do it, and we knew we didn't need to do it, and they knew we knew we didn't need to do it, we used them as an experiment for two atomic bombs."

Clarke died of a heart attack at his home in Clearwater, Florida.

== Personal life ==
General Clarke was married to Jessie Clarke and had a son, Carter W. Clarke Jr. (born August 16, 1926), and two grandchildren. Carter Clarke Jr. is a retired United States Army brigadier general who in 1996 founded Gemesis Corporation, the largest manufacturer of gem-quality synthetic diamonds. Clarke died on September 3, 1987, in Clearwater, Florida, at the age of 90 from a heart attack.
