= Scio Diamond Technology Corporation =

Synthetic diamonds manufacturer

- Traded as: OTC Pink: SCIO
- Industry: Diamond / Manufacturing
- Founded: 17 September 2009
- Headquarters: Greenville, South Carolina, United States
- Key people: Joseph Lancia, Edward Adams, Michael Monahan
- Products: Synthetic diamonds
- Net income: -7,200,000
- Website: www.sciodiamond.com

Scio Diamond Technology Corporation was a synthetic diamond manufacturer that produced near flawless single-crystal diamonds for gemstone and industrial applications, in Greenville, South Carolina. The company produced chemical vapor deposition (CVD) gem-sized synthetic diamond crystals using processes pioneered by Apollo Diamond, and had acquired Apollo Diamond's technology and assets including several US patents on the processes.

== Products ==
Scio's so-called "cultured diamonds", or synthetic diamonds, although not of natural origin, are real diamonds, and thus they have the same physical and optical properties as diamonds formed by geological processes. The company's controlled manufacturing processes enabled it to produce very high-quality, high-purity, high volume, single-crystal colorless, near colorless and fancy colored diamonds to suit a variety of industrial and gemstone applications.

Synthetic diamonds are often viewed as "green" as they are not mined, avoiding the controversy surrounding blood diamonds by ensuring ethical sourcing that does not finance war or violence.

== Alleged fraud and embezzlement ==
In 2017, the United States Department of Justice announced the indictment of Edward S. Adams, the chairman of the board of directors of the company, with "orchestrating an elaborate fraud scheme to embezzle millions of dollars of investors' funds."

== Delisting ==
In August of 2019, the stock (under symbol SCIO) was delisted by the SEC after the company failed to file any financial reports for over two years.

== See also ==
- List of synthetic diamond manufacturers
