= Memorial diamond =

Lab-grown diamonds from animal or human hair or remains

Memorial diamonds (also cremation diamonds) are lab-grown diamonds that are promoted as being produced from carbon extracted from human or pet animal hair or cremated remains that are provided to the producer by the customer.

== History ==
The first lab-made diamonds can be dated back to the 1950s, and memorial diamonds started to appear in the market in the early 2000s. More than one company has claimed to be the first to provide memorial diamonds, and both Heart In Diamond and LifeGem have claimed to have a patent covering the growing of a "personalized gem diamond".

== Production process ==
Memorial diamonds are produced using hair or ashes, often with other carbon ("lab carbon") added.

In case of hair, it is subjected to heat treatment to extract carbon. Some laboratories also analyze the content of hair. A hair analysis report then serves as a client assurance. The process of unique identification of a diamond and a person based on the hair composition is described in the diamond patent RU2282584

Carbon can be obtained from cremated human or animal remains in a particulate or gaseous form. The carbon is then filtered using a conventional filtering technique. The carbon and other elements are then purified and graphitized, for example by a halogen purification technique.

The percentage of carbon used that is extracted from the provided material varies by service provider, with some memorial diamonds containing as little as 3% carbon from the provided material, while at least one producer uses only carbon from the provided material.

Some memorial diamonds are graded by gemological laboratories, such as Gemological Institute of America (US) or Birmingham Assay Office (United Kingdom).

== See also ==
- Śarīra
