= ALTR Created Diamonds =

Brand of lab-grown diamonds

- Products: Lab-grown diamond
- Owners: Amish Shah
- Parent: R.A. Riam Group
- Website: www.altr.nyc

ALTR Created Diamonds is a brand of lab-grown diamonds created by R.A. Riam Group.

== History ==
=== Company ===
ALTR Created Diamonds is a division of the R.A. Riam Group, a wholesale jeweler based in New York City. The principles of Riam Group were heirs to a heritage of 80 years in the mined diamond business, when they released their first lab-grown diamond. Riam introduced ALTR Created Diamonds at JCK Las Vegas trade show in 2016.

=== Founder ===
Amish Shah, Founder of ALTR Created Diamonds, is a pioneer in the lab grown diamond marketplace. After gaining experience, through his family business, in the diamond industry and in fine jewelry at an early age, he joined R & R Grosbard Inc. in New York in 2001 and helped transform it into an international powerhouse. Ten years later, Amish took over its operations and went on to conceive ALTR Created Diamonds, who are the only vertically integrated diamond house growing, manufacturing, designing, and cutting with the world's finest artisans to create the purest form of diamonds (type-IIa diamonds) known to man.

== Pioneers in the Industry ==
=== Leadership ===
ALTR Created Diamonds was featured on the premiere episode of CNBC's "Streets of Dreams with Marcus Lemonis" titled "Diamond District." The episode aired on December 29, 2020. In the interview, ALTR Created Diamonds and their President Amish Shah were showcased as the pioneers in the industry outlining the development of their lab-grown diamonds and the effects the company has had on the diamond market in the past five years.

=== First Lab Grown Diamond Consumer Brand to the Market ===
In 2017, ALTR launched the first-ever lab grown diamond consumer brand, LOVEMONSTER made exclusively from ALTR Created Diamonds featuring larger carat, Type IIA diamonds.

=== Growing Film ===
In 2018, ALTR unveiled the world's first ground-breaking diamond growing film at JCK Las Vegas. The film presents how two technologies (CVD and HPHT) are combined to grow the finest Lab Grown Diamonds for ALTR.

=== Patents ===
ALTR has 49 patents which provides both created diamonds and uniquely created diamond jewelry.

=== International Expansion ===
ALTR Created Diamonds now distributes to 20 countries including the United States, EU, Australia, Germany, Hong Kong, China, India, Canada, Thailand, South Korea, Israel, and South Africa.

=== Largest Lab Grown Pink Diamond in the World ===
In 2018, ALTR showcased a 4-carat lab grown pink diamond, the largest in the world, to Borsheims. The diamond is a 3.99-carat Asscher cut grown using the chemical vapor deposition process (CVD) and was graded by GCAL as a fancy orangy pink of VS2 clarity.

== Awards ==
=== First Place for Laboratory-Created/Gemstone Jewelry Category Of 2020 Instore Design Awards ===
ALTR secured first prize in the 2020 INSTORE Design Awards for Laboratory-Created Diamond and/or Gemstone Jewelry for their 35-carat necklace called 'Indra's Net', which is thought to be the first high-carriage jewelry piece ever to be created in the lab-grown diamond category.
