= Apollo Diamond =

American synthetic diamond manufacturer (1990–2006)

- Industry: Diamond / Manufacturing
- Founded: 2 May 1990
- Defunct: 23 May 2006
- Headquarters: Boston, Massachusetts, United States
- Key people: Robert Linares; Bryant Linares
- Products: Synthetic diamonds
- Website: http://www.sciodiamond.com/

Apollo Diamond Inc. was a company based in Boston, Massachusetts that was able to produce nearly flawless single crystal diamond wafers and crystals. These crystal diamond wafers and crystal are used in the optoelectronics, nanotechnology and in the consumer gem markets. The company used chemical vapor deposition (CVD) for the production of their gem-sized synthetic diamond crystals. They obtained several U.S. patents on the process. By contrast to the previous diamond-making techniques, which usually produced colored diamonds, Apollo Diamond's techniques allowed the production of colorless gems.

In 2011, many assets of Apollo Diamond were acquired by Scio Diamond Technology Corporation, which said it would use the technology at its South Carolina facility.

== See also ==
- List of synthetic diamond manufacturers

== External linksreat ==
- SCIO Diamond website
- Davis, Joshua (September 1, 2003). "The New Diamond Age". Wired.
- Diamonds on Demand, Smithsonian, June, 2008
- US Patents awarded to Apollo Diamond
- USAToday: Nanotechnology's everywhere, May 2005
