= Poly diamond powder =

Type of synthetic diamond produced from detonation

Poly diamond powder is a kind of synthetic diamond which is synthesized through detonation. Compared to mono diamond, poly diamond powder has more crystal edges and grinding surface, where every crystal edge has grinding force. During the polishing process, big grit can fall into small pieces so it can keep the sustaining grinding force without scratches.

== Production method ==
Poly diamond powder is synthesised first through detonation. It is purified and then shaped by crushing, often through the use of a ball mill or jet mill, then it is graded.

== Application ==
Poly diamond powder mainly is used in sapphire substrate, diaphragm, and LED chips.
