= Diamond flaw =

Imperfections in diamond crystals

Diamond flaws are common. Few natural diamonds are perfect; most of them have inclusions or imperfections. These inclusions are also known as flaws and exist in various forms, such as exterior and interior. Inclusions are also classified in the manner in which they were formed. For example, syngenetic diamond inclusions are inclusions which were formed while a diamond formed, while epigenetic inclusions occurred after a diamond was formed.

== Flaws ==
The presence or absence of flaws or inclusions in a diamond is usually decided by examining the stone carefully with a lens having the standard magnifications of 10x. No other magnification should be taken as authoritative. Stones which show no apparent flaws or inclusions under this magnification are regarded as flawless. The term for a scarcely perceptible inclusion is "VVS" for "very very slight (or small)" – which is sometimes offered as flawless. Slightly larger flaws or groups of very thin inclusions are termed "VS" ("very slight"). Larger flaws or inclusions are termed as "SI" (or slightly included). Even larger flaws are termed as "1st pique". Slightly larger flaws classify the stone as "2nd pique" and so on.

Any flaws which are visible with the naked eye would be sufficient to scale the price down considerably.

== External flaws ==
=== Blemishes ===
These diamond flaws are present on the surface of a stone and can occur naturally. However, these are more likely to be caused by the external environment when a diamond was being cut and polished.

=== Scratches ===
These are fine lines found on the surface of the diamond. They may have been present naturally or caused when a diamond was cut. While minor scratches can be removed through proper polishing, deep scratches can rarely be removed by treating the diamond.

=== Extra facets ===
These are usually cut to remove blemishes or certain close to surface inclusions on diamonds. At times these extra facets are also cut to enhance the brilliance of the diamond. These do not usually affect the clarity grade of a diamond.

=== Fracture ===
A breakage in diamonds that is not parallel to the cleavage plane is referred to as a fracture. Fractures are usually irregular in shape, making a diamond look chipped. The practice of fracture filling is commonly employed to improve the diamond clarity of such diamonds.

=== Fingerprints ===
Fingerprint inclusions in the shape of fingerprints can sometimes be found in diamonds. However, such inclusions are rare in diamonds as compared to other stones, such as rubies. Such inclusions are usually formed during fluid assisted partial healing of fractures already present in stones. For this to take place in diamonds, high temperatures and pressure (HTHP) are required, which is unusual. Few such inclusions have been reported in natural blue and colorless diamonds. While this could indicate that diamonds have been HTHP treated, giving the required temperatures for fingerprint inclusions, such is not always the case. The earth may also cause geologically high temperatures, leading to the formation of fingerprint inclusions.

=== Pits ===
Small holes may be present on the surface of a diamond. These pits are usually not visible to the naked eye. However, pits present on the table facet of a diamond are usually visible and reduce the clarity of a diamond.

=== Nicks ===
Diamonds are also chipped at places causing the appearance of nicks. This is often repaired by adding extra facets. However, too many facets reduce the brilliance of a diamond and are to be avoided.

=== Naturals ===
This refers to the original surface of the diamond, which has been left alone and unpolished. Naturals are usually left on or near the girdle of the diamond. While these are considered as blemishes, the presence of naturals is a sign of good cutting practice, where the cutter has managed to retain as much of the original weight as possible. Indented naturals are also seen to exist on some stones, where the portion of the natural is seen to dip inside slightly from the diameter of the stone. Here the cutter usually leaves the indented natural either at the girdle or pavilion of the stone, in order to keep it less noticeable. In such positions, the natural is not visible even with a loupe. Indents can be removed if the cutter polishes out more roughly. However, this would result in a drop of the diamond's weight by up to 25%.

=== Carbons ===
Diamonds are made from carbon, usually graphite. Nevertheless, while a diamond is being formed, it may not totally crystallize, leading to the presence of small dots of black carbon. These black spots have been classified to be those of graphite, pyrrhotite and pentlandite. These surface flaws resemble a small black dot and may affect the clarity of the stone depending on the size of the imperfection. The occurrence of this kind of flaw is less common in diamonds compared to pinpoint inclusions. Carbons are usually seen in white or blue-white stones. Carbons are not commonly found in diamonds of poorer colors. Within the trade, these are called "carbon spots" and may be cleavage cracks which have developed through uneven heating or a blow. Cleavage cracks often appear to be dark or black in normal lighting conditions because of light reflection.

=== Chips ===
The breaking off of a small piece of diamond towards the surface is usually referred to as chipping. The term may be confused with "diamond chips", which refer to very small pieces of diamonds. These are usually caused due to minor impact from the environment. Downward impact caused when a stone is being set or is being worn, can cause chips on the culet of the diamond. As these are commonly caused when a diamond is worn, it is suggested that while diamonds are being set, a little space be left between the base of the diamond and the head of the prongs of the ring. This space acts as a cushion protecting the diamond from possible chipping when it falls. However, chips are easy to remove by treating the diamond.

== Internal flaws ==
Every natural diamond crystal contains impurities and typical intrinsic or "self-defects": vacancies, dislocations, and interstitial atoms. The most common impurity in diamond is nitrogen, which can comprise up to 1% of a diamond by mass. Nitrogen as a diamond impurity was first identified in 1959 by Kaiser and Bond of Bell Telephone.

=== Crystal/mineral inclusions ===
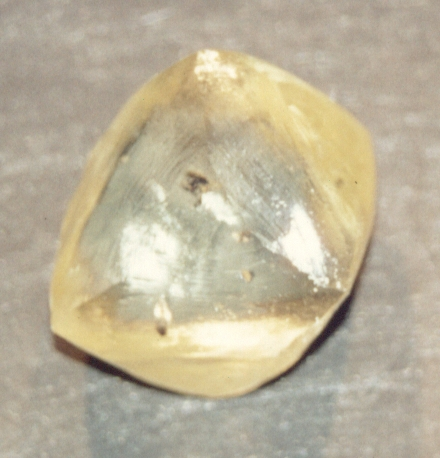
An inclusion is visible in near the center of an uncut diamond

Some diamonds show the presence of small crystals, minerals or other diamonds. These are classified in different categories depending on the size and structure of the inclusion. While many such inclusions are small and invisible to the naked eye, some diamonds may have large inclusions able to be seen with the naked eye, and can affect a diamond's clarity and life. Some crystals resemble a diamond inside a diamond and may also add to the appearance of the stone. These take on shapes of bubbles, needles or grains and are classified as below.

=== Pinpoint inclusions ===
As the name implies, these inclusions are minute crystals usually white in color present inside the diamond. These resemble a small point of light and are, by far, the most common of all flaws found in diamonds. Most pinpoint inclusions do not affect the clarity of a diamond and are not visible to the naked eye and are usually not indicated on the plotting diagrams of diamond reports. Comments such as "pinpoints not shown" may be listed in the comments section.

=== Needles ===
Diamond crystals in a diamond can also be present in the form of long and thin needles. These may not be visible to the naked eye, unless the needle inclusion is of a noticeable color or has a noticeable presence. Some needle inclusions are also known to give diamonds a special look.

=== Cloud ===
The presence of three or more pinpoint inclusions close together can create an area of haze, or a cloud, in the diamond. While the occurrence of a small cloud is not visible to the naked eye, presence of many pinpoints covering a large area can affect the clarity of the diamond. These are usually indicated on grading reports in the form of tiny red dots close together or as circles and other formations.

=== Knots ===
When diamond crystals extend to the surface of the diamond, they are referred to as knots. These can be viewed under proper lighting conditions with a diamond loupe. Certain knot formations may also cause raised areas on particular facets of the diamond. The presence of knots may affect both the clarity and durability of the diamond and are best avoided.

=== Graining ===
Crystal inclusions in diamonds occurs in the form of lines known as graining. Graining should not be confused with a rough diamonds natural grain lines . Graining forms due to the improper crystallization of the diamond or when a diamond is twinned. Twinned diamonds are two diamonds that have grown together and causes cross-grains within the diamond during its growth / crystallization process. Twinning causes natural lines, planes or cross-grains in a diamond. Graining can't be removed during the polishing process of a diamond as it is a natural plane within the diamond. Cross-graining also makes the polishing process extremely difficult for diamond cutters as a diamond only cuts against its natural grain lines and never with the grain. One will always find graining in rough diamonds known as "Macle's". Macles are easily identified by its triangular shape. The graining line on the Macle is a natural cleaving plane where the diamond can easily be split in half. Diamonds with graining will never be graded as Flawless as its maximum grade would only fetch Internally Flawless (IF). Although graining seems like a severe flaw it is not visible with the naked eye and does not impact the overall brilliance or quality of a diamond.

=== Feathers ===
These are cracks in the stone that resemble the design of feathers. The presence of feathers in a diamond usually does not affect the life of the stone unless and until the feather runs through a major length of the stone or shows major stress points where it can break. If the cracks reach the surface or have deep fissures, the durability of the stone may be reduced with the possibility of the stone breaking with age.

=== Intergrowths ===
Twinning wisps or intergrowths may also be seen in diamonds. These formations are usually inclusions in diamonds that have twisted together during the time of diamond formation. Thus, various inclusions such as pinpoints, needles or feathers may form together, creating a white strip inside the diamond. Surface graining may also be seen in some cases. Such intergrowths are more commonly seen in fancy cut diamonds and are extremely rare in ideal cut diamonds.

=== Cleavage ===
These are cracks in a diamond that occur in a straight line and are parallel to one of the diamond's crystallographic planes. Cleavages are usually caused by deep internal strain in a diamond and could also have been caused by a strong blow to the diamond. It usually shows no feathers and has a great chance of causing the stone to split, especially if placed in the high pressure grip of prongs in rings. Stones with cleavage must be chosen carefully and avoided as often as possible.

=== Etch channel ===
Etch channels are created during a diamond's formation process deep in the Earth. In the journey of the rough diamond to the Earth's surface, the contact with high-temperature fluids etches into the diamond's crystalline structure which often leave parallel lines or irregularly shaped tunnel-like structures.

=== Bearding ===
Also known as girdle fencing or "dig marks", this is caused around the diamond's girdle as the diamond is cut or bruted. These fine lines usually resemble a strand of hair and do not present a problem. However, extensive bearding can lessen the brightness of the diamond. It is suitable that such diamonds be cut or polished again to improve luster.

Diamond flaws are not always negative features. In fact, these flaws often lend a diamond its distinctive beauty and make a stone look unique.

== See also ==
- Carbon flaw
- Diamond (gemstone)
- Diamond cubic
- Diamond drilling
