= Bort =

Shards of non-gem-quality diamonds

Bort (also boort or boart)
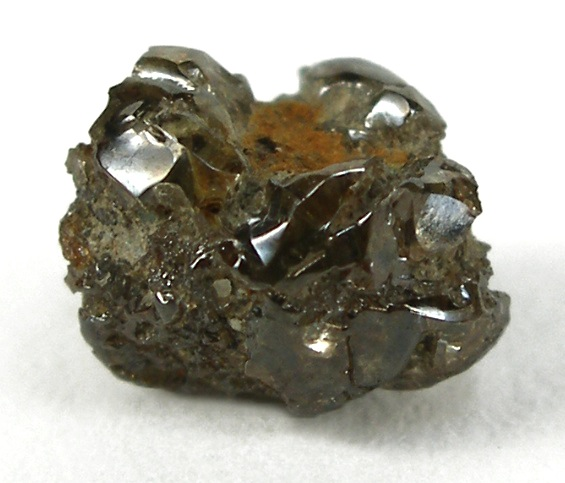
- A mixture of bort and gem diamonds (larger inclusions) from the Crater of Diamonds State Park

General
- Category: Mineral variety
- Formula: C

Identification
- Color: Varies (white to yellowish in powder form, yellow to brownish in larger shards)
- Use/purpose: Diamond industry; Abrasive; Polishing; Lubricant (as oil additive)

Major varieties
- Similar occurrences: Diamond; Ballas; Graphite; Carbon; Carbonado; Coal

Bort, boart, or boort is an umbrella term used in the diamond industry to refer to shards of non-gem-grade/quality diamonds. In the manufacturing and heavy industries, "bort" is used to describe dark, imperfectly formed or crystallized diamonds of varying levels of opacity. The word is ultimately Dutch and is related to the English term for drilling, to bore. The lowest grade, "crushing bort", is crushed by steel mortars and used to make industrial-grade abrasive grits. Small bort crystals are used in drill bits. The Democratic Republic of the Congo provides 75% of the world supply of crushing bort.

== Use and application ==
Bort is commonly used as an abrasive. Smaller flakes and particles are used as an additive for scouring or polishing pastes and agents. Larger particles can be added to cutting, drilling and grinding tools to improve their lifespan and substantially increase their efficiency.

Bort particles varying from one to two nanometers are added to lubricants such as paraffin oil. These particles will embed themselves into minute irregularities and imperfections of moving-part surfaces. Particles that remain suspended in the lubricant oil act as both a polishing agent, further smoothening the surfaces, and as ball bearings between the surfaces. Such nanotechnology applications with paraffin oil containing approximately 1% of these nano-size bort particles may decrease the friction up to half of that without the nano-particles.

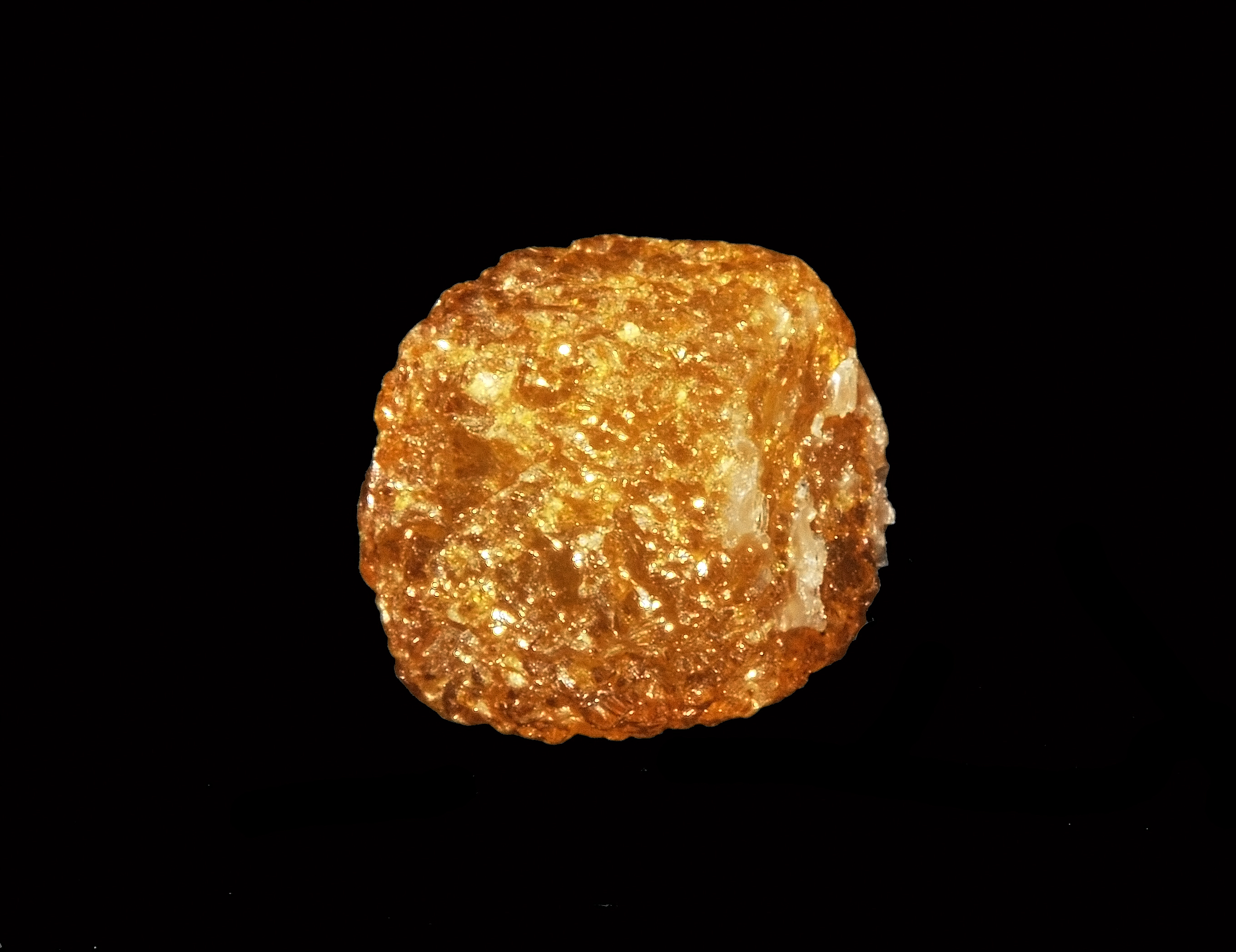
Bort-like heavily twinned diamond from Congo

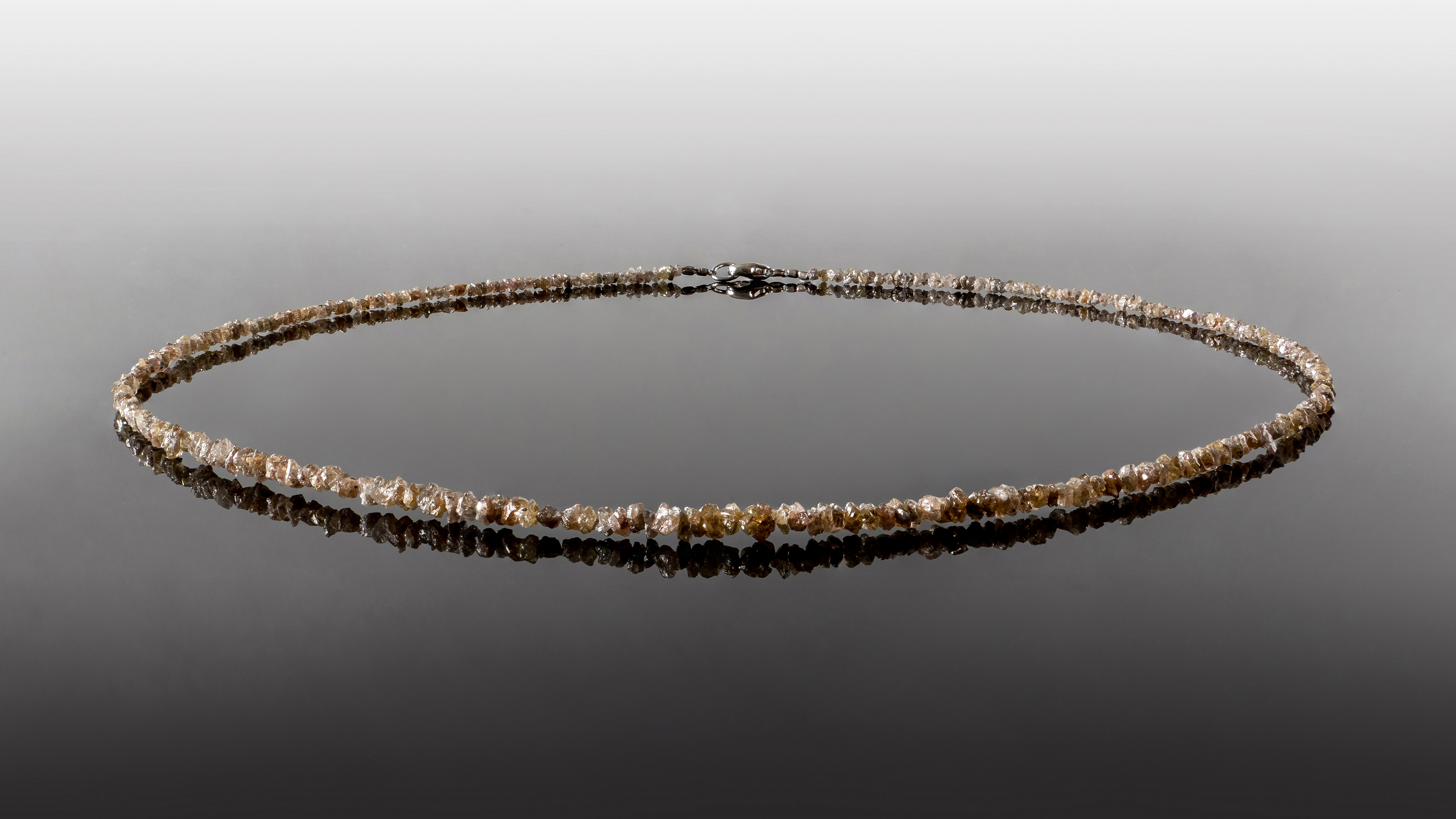
Necklace made of cut-off chips and low-quality rough diamonds

== See also ==
- Ballas
- Carbonado (black diamond)
- Rough diamond
- Synthetic diamond
