= Detonation nanodiamond =

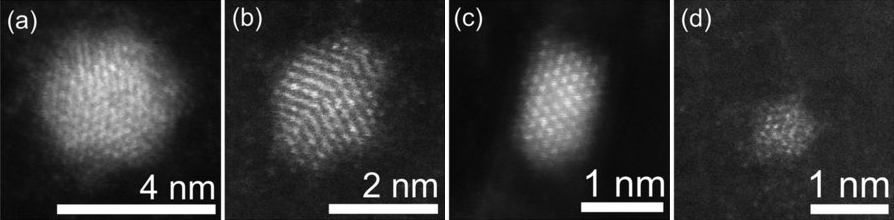
Individual DNDs before and after annealing at 520 °C

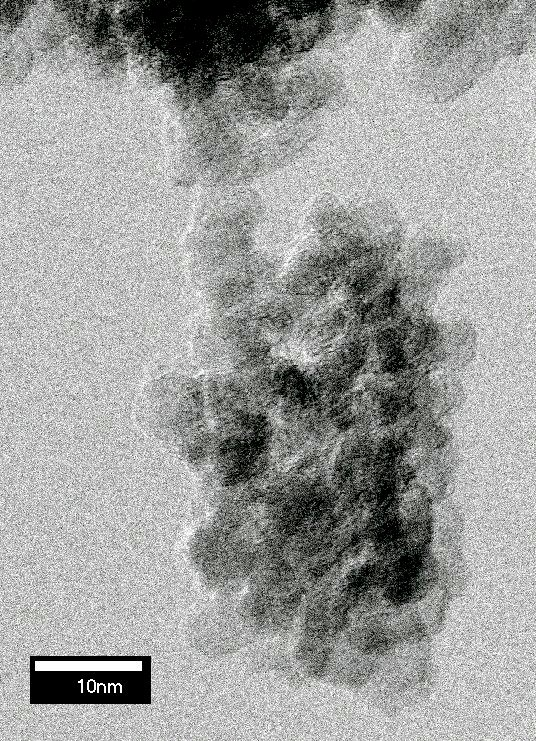
Electron micrograph of aggregated DNDs

Trinitrotoluene (TNT) structure

Hexogen (RDX) structure

Detonation nanodiamond (DND), also known as ultradispersed diamond (UDD), is diamond that originates from a detonation. When an oxygen-deficient explosive mixture of TNT/RDX is detonated in a closed chamber, diamond particles with a diameter of c. 5 nm are formed at the front of the detonation wave in the span of several microseconds.

== Properties ==
The diamond yield after detonation crucially depends on the synthesis condition and especially on the heat capacity of the cooling medium in the detonation chamber (water, air, CO_{2}, etc.). The higher the cooling capacity, the larger the diamond yield, which can reach 90%. After the synthesis, diamond is extracted from the soot using high-temperature high-pressure (autoclave) boiling in acid for a long period (c. 1–2 days). The boiling removes most of the metal contamination, originating from the chamber materials, and non-diamond carbon.

Various measurements, including X-ray diffraction and high-resolution transmission electron microscopy, revealed that the size of the diamond grains in the soot is distributed around 5 nm. The grains are unstable with respect to aggregation and spontaneously form micrometre-sized clusters (see figure above). The adhesion is strong and contacts between a few nano-grains can hold a micrometre-sized cluster attached to a substrate.

Nanosized diamond has extremely large relative surface area. As a result, its surface spontaneously attaches water and hydrocarbon molecules from the ambient atmosphere. However, clean nanodiamond surface can be obtained with appropriate handling.

The detonation nanodiamond grains mostly have diamond cubic lattice and are structurally imperfect. The major defects are multiple twins, as suggested by high-resolution transmission electron microscopy. Despite the carbon source for the diamond synthesis—TNT/RDX explosive mixture—being rich in nitrogen, concentration of paramagnetic nitrogen inside diamond grains is below one part per million (ppm). Paramagnetic nitrogen (neutral nitrogen atoms substituting for carbon in the diamond lattice) is the major form of nitrogen in diamond, and thus the nitrogen content in DND is probably very low.

== Alternative synthesis methods ==
Diamond nanocrystals can also be synthesized from a suspension of graphite in organic liquid at atmospheric pressure and room temperature using ultrasonic cavitation. The yield is approximately 10%. The cost of nanodiamonds produced by this method are estimated to be competitive with the HPHT process.

An alternative synthesis technique is irradiation of graphite by high-energy laser pulses. The structure and particle size of the obtained diamond is rather similar to that obtained in explosion. In particular, many particles exhibit multiple twinning.

A research group from Case Western Reserve University produced nanodiamonds 2–5 nm in size at near-ambient conditions by a microplasma process. The nanodiamonds are formed directly from a gas and require no surface to grow on.

== Applications ==
Commercial products based on nanodiamonds are available for the following applications:

1. Lapping and polishing (e.g. Sufipol);
2. Additives to engine oils (e.g. ADDO);
3. Dry lubricants for metal industry (Drawing of W-, Mo-, V-, Rh-wires);
4. Reinforcing fillers for plastic and rubber, to modify the mechanical and thermal properties;
5. Thermal fillers for plastic and rubber, to create thermally conductive but electrically insulating materials for electronics);
6. Additives to electroplating electrolyte (e.g. DiamoSilb, DiamoChrom, Carbodeon uDiamond)
7. Refined diamonds added to ceramic coatings for paint (e.g. C6 Ceramics);

== Use in medicine ==
Nanomaterials can shuttle chemotherapy drugs to cells without producing the negative effects of today's delivery agents. Clusters of the nanodiamonds surround the drugs ensuring that they remain separated from healthy cells, preventing unnecessary damage; upon reaching the intended targets, the drugs are released into the cancer cells. The leftover diamonds, hundreds of thousands of which could fit into the eye of a needle, do not induce inflammation in cells once they have done their job.

== Ig Nobel 2012 Peace Prize ==
In 2012 the SKN Company was awarded the Ig Nobel Peace Prize for converting old Russian ammunition into nanodiamonds.
