= Ballas =

Shards of non-gem-grade/quality, spherical diamonds with no crystal form

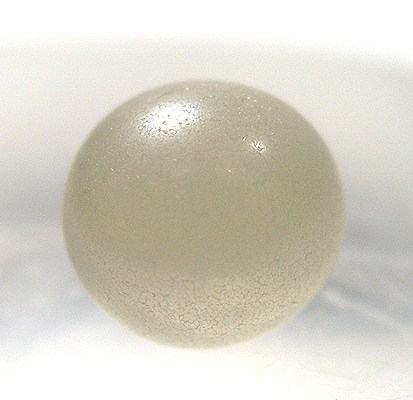
Brazilian ballas

Ballas (or shot bort) is a diamond industry term for roughly spherical shards of non-gem-grade diamond, mostly mined in Brazil and South Africa.

A ballas is an aggregate of diamond grains concentrically arranged with radiating structure into a roughly spherical stone with a fibrous texture and without throughgoing cleavage planes. Tougher and more difficult to cleave than crystalline stones, ballas are used as industrial diamonds.
