= Huron Capital Partners =

American private equity firm

Huron Capital Partners, LLC is a Detroit-based private equity firm specializing in the recapitalization of private companies in the lower middle-market. It was founded in 1999. and has invested in or acquired more than 130 companies. As of 2018, it was the biggest private equity company in Michigan.

Huron Capital has raised more than $1.8 billion of capital through its six private equity funds. A private equity fund represents money or commitments from a variety of investors (usually including the advisory firm itself) managed by the firm that sponsors the fund. The company currently targets companies with revenue up to $200 million. In 2016, the company completed 16 add-on deals across eight different platform companies, within 11 different states. In August 2020, the company completed its 200th acquisition since 1999.

The business magazine Mergers & Acquisitions declared Huron Capital the Seller of the Year in the middle-market category in 2018.
