= Carbon flaw =

Blemish in diamond crystalline form of carbon

A carbon flaw is a blemish present within a diamond crystalline form of carbon, usually seen as a black spot. The blemish may be microscopic or visible to the naked eye. The spots are undesirable imperfections since they can be seen more easily than other flaws. While diamonds are composed of purely carbon, the black spot flaws could be other inclusions (foreign matter) such as olivine, garnet, pyrite, silica, calcite, and iron oxides.

== Appearance ==
Carbon flaws can come in many different appearances. They can range in size from specks so small they can barely be seen with the a magnifying glass to spots and clusters clearly visible to the naked eye. A carbon flaw can appear as a sharply defined spot or as an amorphous cloud, like a shadow in the stone.

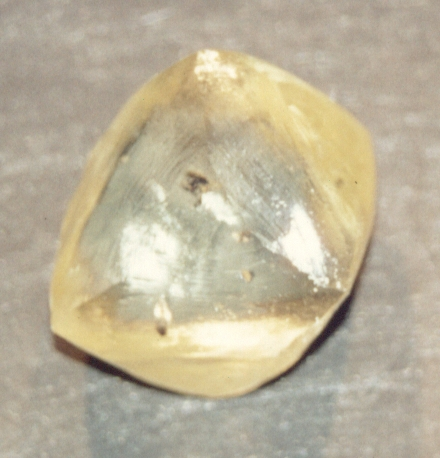
An inclusion is visible in near the center of an uncut diamond.

The appearance of a spot usually indicates an inclusion of uncrystallized carbon, but a cloudy carbon flaw is indicative of improper or irregular crystallization. Carbon flaws can also appear as small, fuzzy dots, somewhere between a speck and a cloud. Another common carbon flaw appears as a black shard or needle through the stone.

These flaws are regarded as undesirable in any stone, though the appearance of carbon flaws is more notable in white stones. The presence of these flaws can severely impact the value of the stone, despite its carat weight. Most flaws that do not affect the clarity or brilliance of the diamond are usually seen as ugly and will drive buyers away from a stone. The flaws that affect brilliance make it difficult to sell a stone at any price.

== Formation ==
The reason for the formation of carbon flaws is largely unknown. It is theorized that, though the material was exposed to the same conditions of heat and pressure as the rest of the crystal, there may be some other factor not evenly distributed throughout the carbon that formed the diamond. Many chemical actions happening simultaneously could possibly cause carbon in the solution to surround particles that escaped the solvent. Another theory is that diamonds are formed by the slow accretion of crystals. That means that the crystal structure forms and grows around a single nucleus of the element and that nucleus can be excluded from the crystallization process. The nucleus is then surrounded by crystallized diamond and becomes a carbon flaw. The nuclei are theorized to be other common forms of carbon such as graphite or carbonado, though they could be an amorphous carbon structure.

== Effect on strength ==
A carbon flaw in a diamond has a severe impact on strength. Any inclusion in a diamond is a weak point in the crystalline structure and will make the stone more prone to breakage. Specifically, if a cloud forms too close to the surface of the diamond, or the diamond is cut too close to a flaw, it will appear as a crack in the surface. Flaws near or on the surface of a diamond also appear as rough patches and are usually removed when the diamond is being cut for sale. A small crack in the surface of a diamond caused by an extensive flaw in its crystalline structure makes the diamond prone to further cracking. Diamonds flawed in this way are liable to crack under a modest sudden change in temperature or a sharp blow.

== See also ==
- Diamond flaw
