= International Gemological Institute =

Jewellery grading organization

- Type: Public
- Traded as: NSE: IGIL; BSE: 544311
- Industry: Gemstone grading
- Founded: 1975; 51 years ago in Antwerp, Belgium
- Headquarters: Mumbai, India
- Parent: Blackstone Group; (2023–present)
- Website: igi.org

International Gemological Institute (IGI) is a gemological organization which certifies diamond, coloured stone and jewellery. It was established in 1975 in Belgium.

On 21 May 2023, Blackstone Group announced their acquisition of IGI.

== History ==
In March 2007, IGI collaborated with the Tanzanite Foundation to help distribute jewellery certificates using a grading scale called the Tanzanite Quality Scale (TQS), for the gem called Tanzanite, which was discovered in Tanzania in the 1960s.

In April 2010, IGI opened a laboratory in Surat, its fifth diamond grading laboratory in India.

== Operations ==
IGI has a staff of over 650 gemologists, appraisers and professional office personnel.

IGI provides its services to the public through diamond dealers, and jewellery manufactures. IGI provides independent grading reports, coloured stone reports, identification and appraisal reports, diamond authentication and attestations of origin, and laser inscription services. They also offers diamond and coloured stone courses through IGI's Schools of Gemology. Graduates from the IGI school of Gemology are awarded an IGI Diploma.

== Market position ==
IGI is the largest laboratory for certification of diamonds and fine jewellery. IGI is International Organization for Standardization (ISO) 9001: 2000 certified in four countries, including the United States, Canada, India and the United Arab Emirates.
