= Bars =

Bars may refer to:

- Bar (establishment) (plural bars), a retail establishment that serves alcoholic beverages
- Bar (disambiguation), plural form of various other things
- Bar (food)
- Dessert bar, a confection that has the texture of a firm cake or soft cookie
- Parallel bars, apparatus in men's gymnastics
- Uneven bars, apparatus in women's gymnastics
- Bar (unit), metric unit of pressure

== Places ==
- Bars, Dordogne, a commune of the Dordogne département in France
- Bars, Gers, a commune of the Gers département in France
- Bars, Iran, a village in Chaharmahal and Bakhtiari Province, Iran
- Bars, Punjab, an area in Punjab, Pakistan
- Bars County, a former Kingdom of Hungary county in present-day Slovakia

== People ==
- Hugues Le Bars, a 20th-century French musical composer
- Joseph Barss (disambiguation)
- Bars Bek, an 8th-century kagan of Central Asia

== Other uses ==
- Bars (hunting rifle), Soviet and Russian hunting rifle
- "Bars" (song), by Dallas Smith from the 2020 album Timeless
- Bars-class submarine (1915), a group of submarines built for the Imperial Russian Navy
- BARS apparatus, a high-pressure high-temperature apparatus usually used for growing or processing minerals, especially diamond
- Bars radar, a family of Russian (former USSR) all-weather multimode airborne radars
- UAZ Bars, a Russian all-terrain vehicle
- Behaviorally anchored rating scales (BARS), used to report performance in psychology research on behaviorism
- B.A.R.S., an album by hip-hop artist Cassidy
- A variant name for the children's game darebase
- Slang term for alprazolam (Xanax), a tranquilizer
- Bars Kazan, a Russian professional ice hockey team from Kazan

== See also ==
- BARS (disambiguation)
