= BARS =

BARS may refer to:

- BARS (Russia), a Russian military reserve force
- BARS (tropospheric scatter network), a Warsaw Pact tropospheric scatter communications network in Eastern Europe
- BARS apparatus, a high-pressure apparatus for growing/processing minerals
- B.A.R.S. The Barry Adrian Reese Story, an album by hip-hop artist Cassidy
- Balanced Automatics Recoil System, a small-arms recoil reduction system developed by Peter Andreevich Tkachev
- Behaviorally anchored rating scales, used to report performance in psychology research on behaviorism
- British American Railway Services, former train owner and operator in the United Kingdom
- Buenos Aires Rojo Sangre, a film festival

Bars may refer to:

- Bars, Dordogne, commune of the Dordogne département in France
- Bars, Gers, a commune of the Gers département in France
- Bars-class submarine (1915) built for the Imperial Russian Navy
- Bars county, a former Kingdom of Hungary county in present-day Slovakia
- Bars radar, a family of Russian (former USSR) airborne radars
- Bars Soviet submarine; see Akula-class submarine
- bars, plural of bar
