= Sky =

Unobstructed view upward from Earth

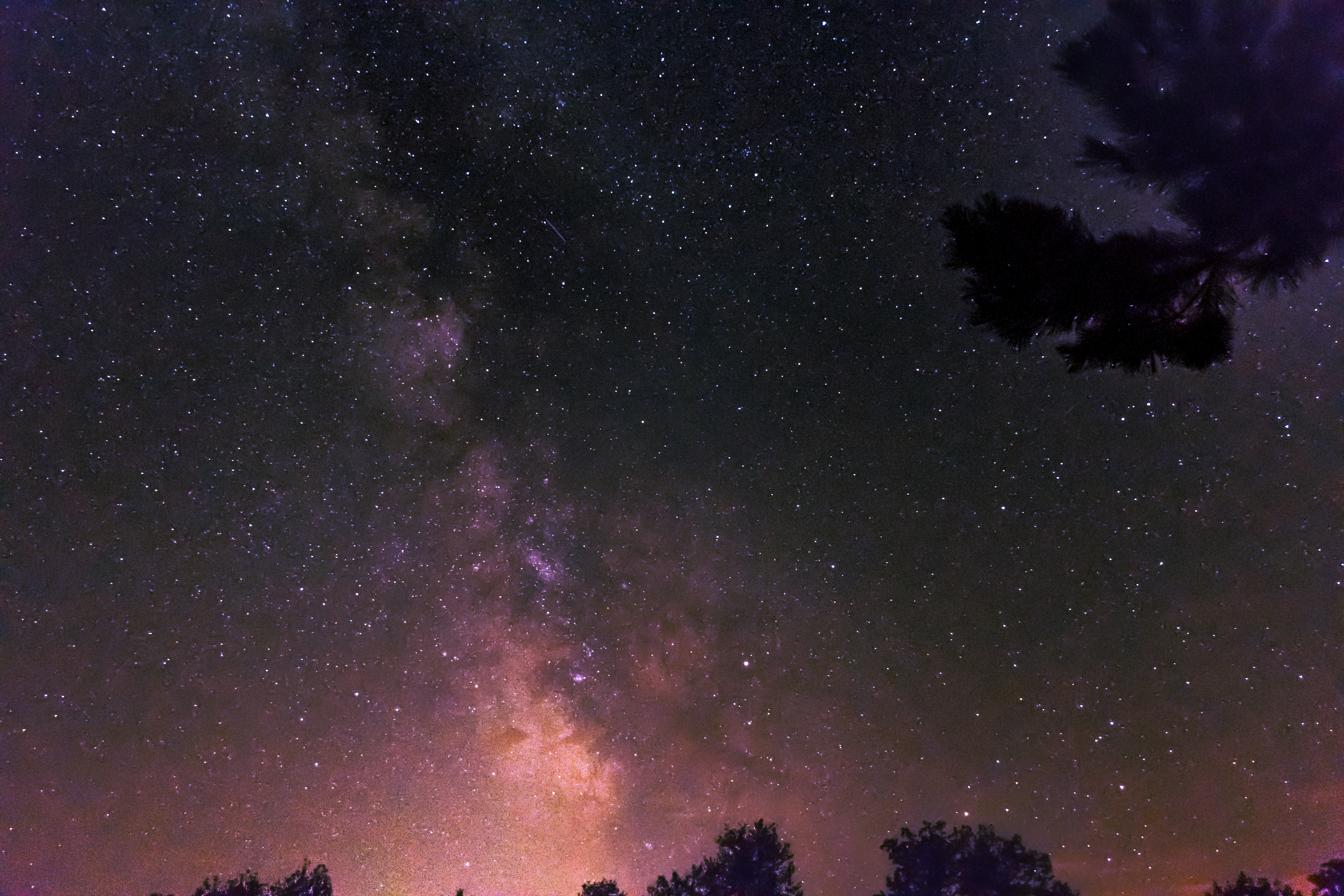
The night sky over Slovenia in July

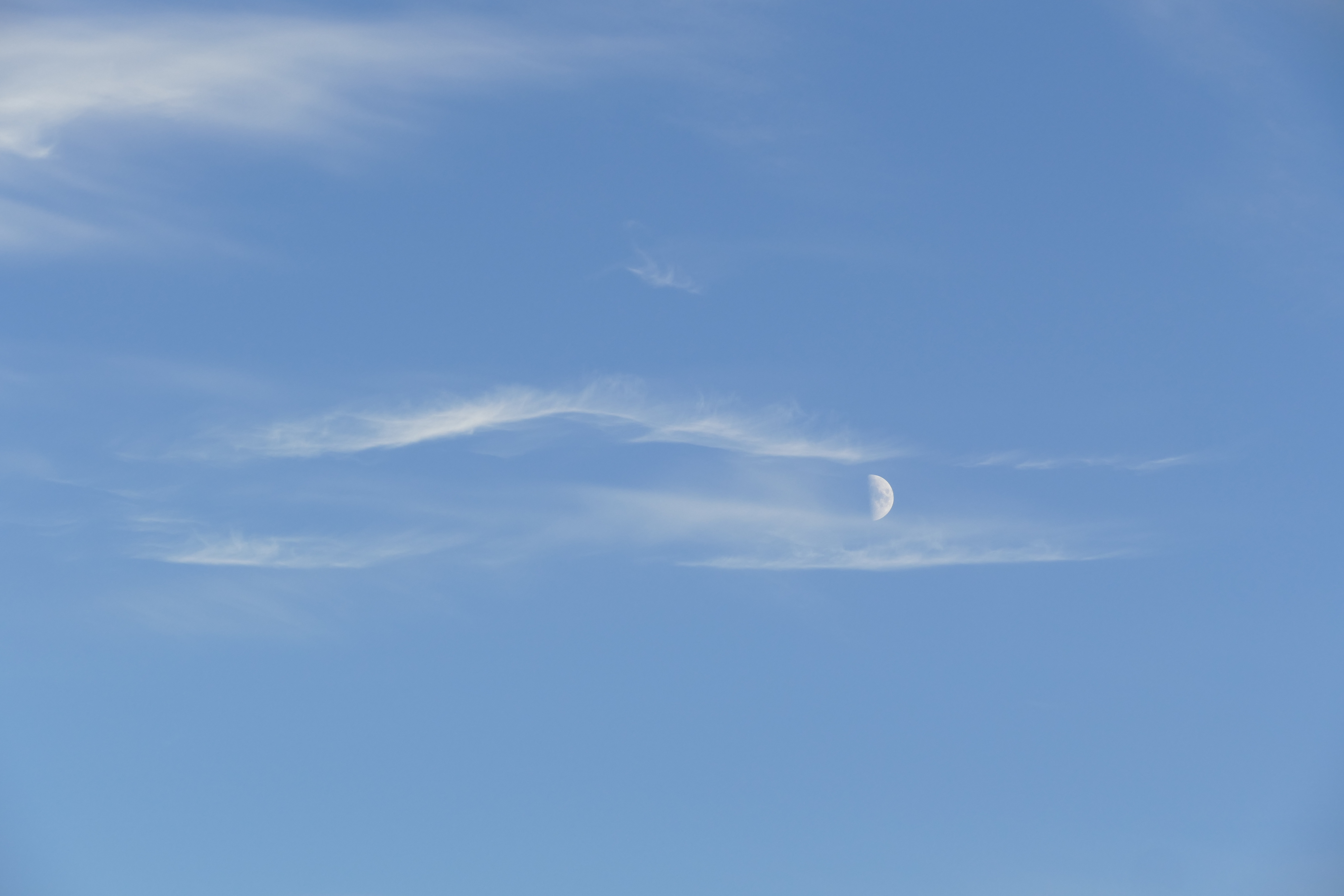
Cirriform clouds and a quarter Moon in the blue daytime sky over Germany

The sky is an unobstructed view upward from the surface of the Earth. It includes the atmosphere and outer space. It may also be considered a place between the ground and outer space, thus distinct from outer space.

In the field of astronomy, the sky is also called the celestial sphere. This is an abstract sphere, concentric to the Earth, on which the Sun, Moon, planets, and stars appear to be drifting. The celestial sphere is conventionally divided into designated areas called constellations.

Usually, the term sky informally refers to a perspective from the Earth's surface; however, the meaning and usage can vary. An observer on the surface of the Earth can see a small part of the sky, which resembles a dome (sometimes called the sky bowl) appearing flatter during the day than at night. In some cases, such as in discussing the weather, the sky refers to only the lower, denser layers of the atmosphere.

The daytime sky appears blue because air molecules scatter shorter wavelengths of sunlight more than longer ones (redder light). The night sky appears to be a mostly dark surface or region spangled with stars. The Sun and sometimes the Moon are visible in the daytime sky unless obscured by clouds. At night, the Moon, planets, and stars are similarly visible in the sky.

Some of the natural phenomena seen in the sky are clouds, rainbows, and aurorae. Lightning and precipitation are also visible in the sky. Certain birds and insects, as well as human inventions like aircraft and kites, can fly in the sky. Due to human activities, smog during the day and light pollution during the night are often seen above large cities.

== Etymology ==
The word sky comes from the Old Norse sky, meaning 'cloud, abode of God'. The Norse term is also the source of the Old English scēo, which shares the same Indo-European base as the classical Latin obscūrus, meaning 'obscure'.

In Old English, the term heaven was used to describe the observable expanse above the earth. During the period of Middle English, "heaven" began shifting toward its current, religious meaning.

== During daytime ==
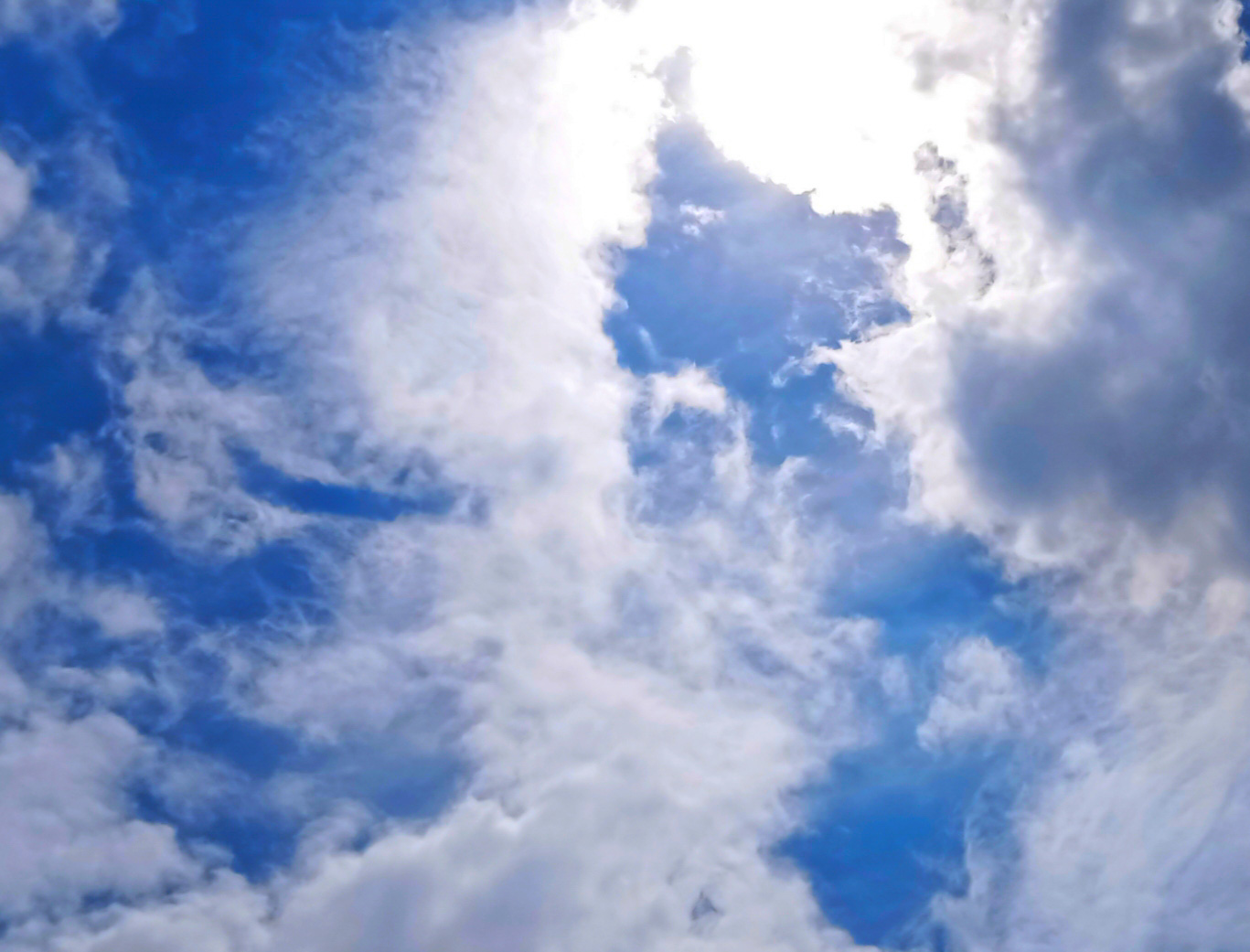
Sky during day time

Clear skies over Yekaterinburg, Russia

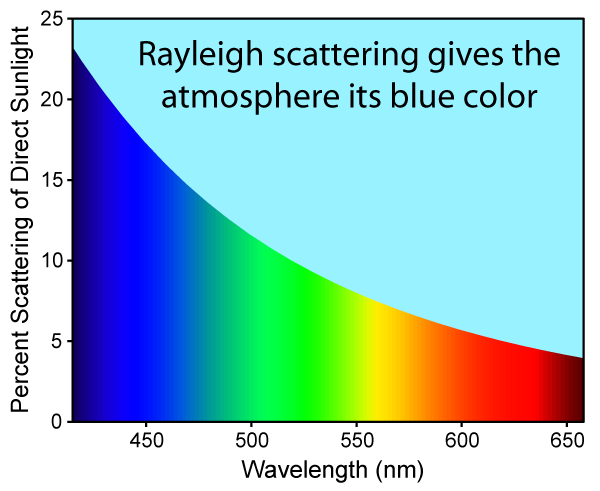
Earth's atmosphere scatters a greater proportion of blue light than of red light.

Except for direct sunlight, most of the light in the daytime sky is caused by scattering, which is dominated by a small-particle limit called Rayleigh scattering. The scattering due to molecule-sized particles (as in air) is greater in the directions both toward and away from the source of light than it is in directions perpendicular to the incident path. Scattering is significant for light at all visible wavelengths, but is stronger at the shorter (bluer) end of the visible spectrum, meaning that the scattered light is bluer than its source: the Sun. The remaining direct sunlight, having lost some of its shorter-wavelength components, appears slightly less blue.

Scattering also occurs even more strongly in clouds. Individual water droplets refract white light into a set of colored rings. If a cloud is thick enough, scattering from multiple water droplets will wash out the set of colored rings and create a washed-out white color.

The sky can turn a multitude of colors such as red, orange, purple, and yellow (especially near sunset or sunrise) when the light must travel a much longer path (or optical depth) through the atmosphere. Scattering effects also partially polarize light from the sky and are most pronounced at an angle 90° from the Sun. Scattered light from the horizon travels through as much as 38 times the air mass as does light from the zenith, causing a blue gradient looking vivid at the zenith and pale near the horizon. Red light is also scattered if there is enough air between the source and the observer, causing parts of the sky to change color as the Sun rises or sets. As the air mass nears infinity, scattered daylight appears whiter and whiter.

Apart from the Sun, distant clouds or snowy mountaintops may appear yellow. The effect is not very obvious on clear days, but is very pronounced when clouds cover the line of sight, reducing the blue hue from scattered sunlight. At higher altitudes, the sky tends toward darker colors since scattering is reduced due to lower air density. An extreme example is the Moon, where no atmospheric scattering occurs, making the lunar sky black even when the Sun is visible.

Sky luminance distribution models have been recommended by the International Commission on Illumination (CIE) for the design of daylighting schemes. Recent developments relate to "all sky models" for modelling sky luminance under weather conditions ranging from clear to overcast.

== During twilight ==
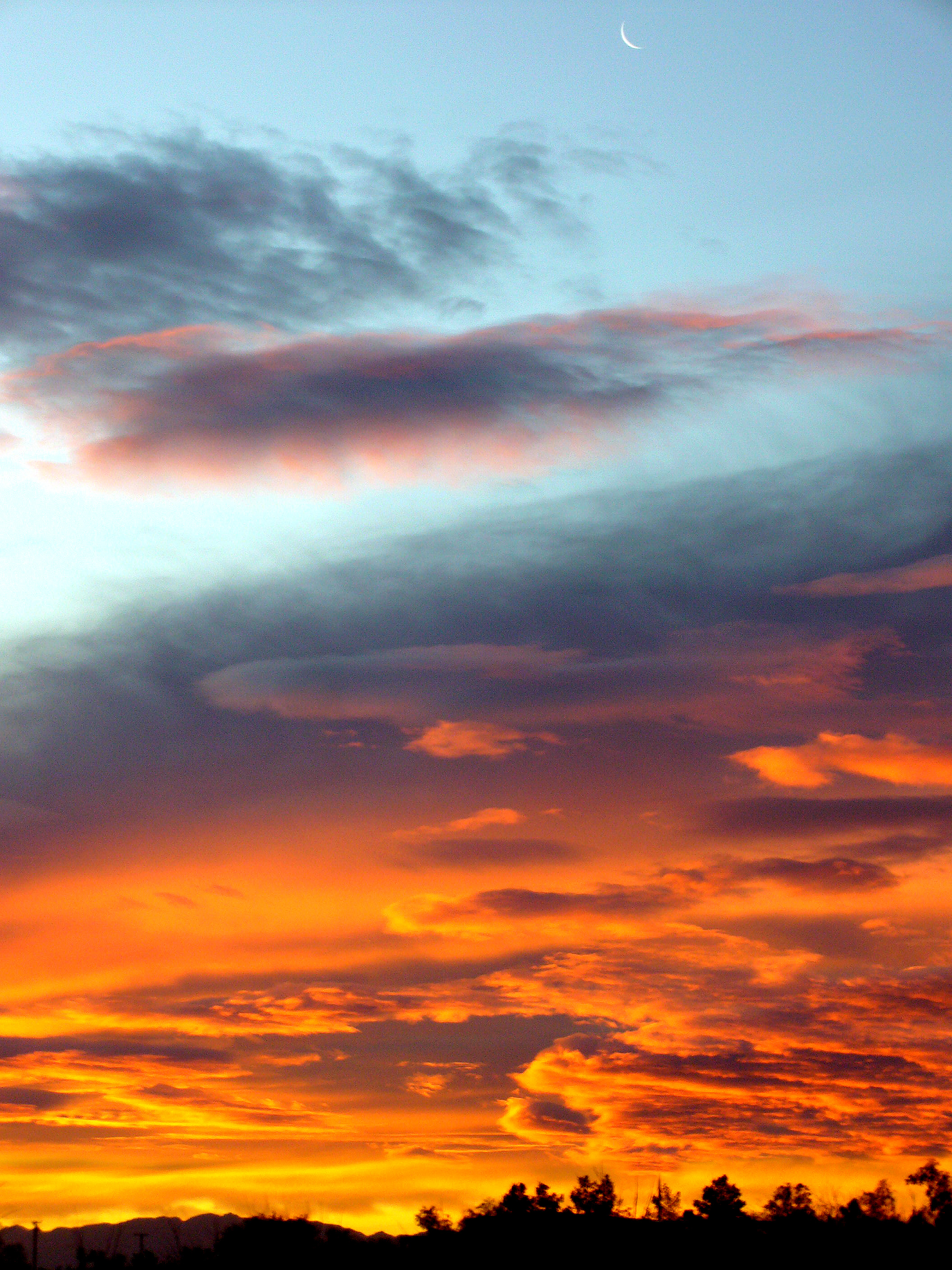
The crescent Moon remains visible just moments before sunrise.

Civil, nautical, and astronomical twilight. Dusk is the end of evening twilight.

Dawn is the beginning of morning twilight.

The brightness and color of the sky vary greatly over the course of a day, and the primary cause of these properties differs as well. When the Sun is well above the horizon, direct scattering of sunlight (Rayleigh scattering) is the overwhelmingly dominant source of light. However, during twilight, the period between sunset and night or between night and sunrise, the situation is more complex.

Green flashes and green rays are optical phenomena that occur shortly after sunset or before sunrise, when a green spot is visible above the Sun, usually for no more than a second or two, or it may resemble a green ray shooting up from the sunset point. Green flashes are a group of phenomena that stem from different causes, most of which occur when there is a temperature inversion (when the temperature increases with altitude rather than the normal decrease in temperature with altitude). Green flashes may be observed from any altitude (even from an aircraft). They are usually seen above an unobstructed horizon, such as over the ocean, but are also seen above clouds and mountains. Green flashes may also be observed at the horizon in association with the Moon and bright planets, including Venus and Jupiter.

Earth's shadow is the shadow that the planet casts through its atmosphere and into outer space. This atmospheric phenomenon is visible during civil twilight (after sunset and before sunrise). When the weather conditions and the observing site permit a clear view of the horizon, the shadow's fringe appears as a dark or dull bluish band just above the horizon, in the low part of the sky opposite of the (setting or rising) Sun's direction. A related phenomenon is the Belt of Venus (or antitwilight arch), a pinkish band that is visible above the bluish band of Earth's shadow in the same part of the sky. No defined line divides Earth's shadow and the Belt of Venus; one colored band fades into the other in the sky.

Twilight is divided into three stages according to the Sun's depth below the horizon, measured in segments of 6°. After sunset, the civil twilight sets in; it ends when the Sun drops more than 6° below the horizon. This is followed by the nautical twilight, when the Sun is between 6° and 12° below the horizon (depth between −6° and −12°), after which comes the astronomical twilight, defined as the period between −12° and −18°. When the Sun drops more than 18° below the horizon, the sky generally attains its minimum brightness.

Several sources can be identified as the source of the intrinsic brightness of the sky, namely airglow, indirect scattering of sunlight, scattering of starlight, and artificial light pollution.

== During the night ==
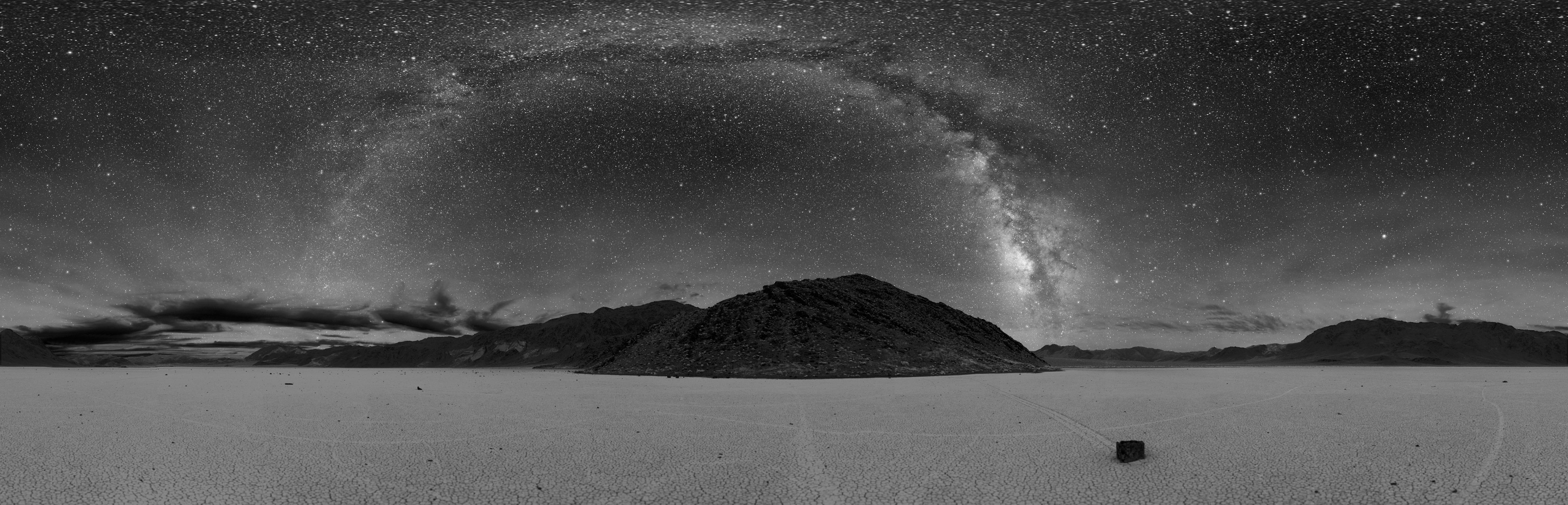
The Milky Way can be seen as a large band across the night sky, and is distorted into an arch in this 360° panorama.

The term night sky refers to the sky as seen at night. The term is usually associated with skygazing and astronomy, with reference to views of celestial bodies such as stars, the Moon, and planets that become visible on a clear night after the Sun has set. Natural light sources in a night sky include moonlight, starlight, and airglow, depending on location and timing. The fact that the sky is not completely dark at night can be easily observed. Were the sky (in the absence of moon and city lights) absolutely dark, one would not be able to see the silhouette of an object against the sky.

The night sky and studies of it have a historical place in both ancient and modern cultures. In the past, for instance, farmers have used the state of the night sky as a calendar to determine when to plant crops. The ancient belief in astrology is generally based on the belief that relationships between heavenly bodies influence or convey information about events on Earth. The scientific study of the night sky and bodies observed within it, meanwhile, takes place in the science of astronomy.

Within visible-light astronomy, the visibility of celestial objects in the night sky is affected by light pollution. The presence of the Moon in the night sky has historically hindered astronomical observation by increasing the amount of ambient lighting. With the advent of artificial light sources, however, light pollution has been a growing problem for viewing the night sky. Special filters and modifications to light fixtures can help to alleviate this problem, but for the best views, both professional and amateur optical astronomers seek viewing sites located far from major urban areas.

== Use in weather forecasting ==
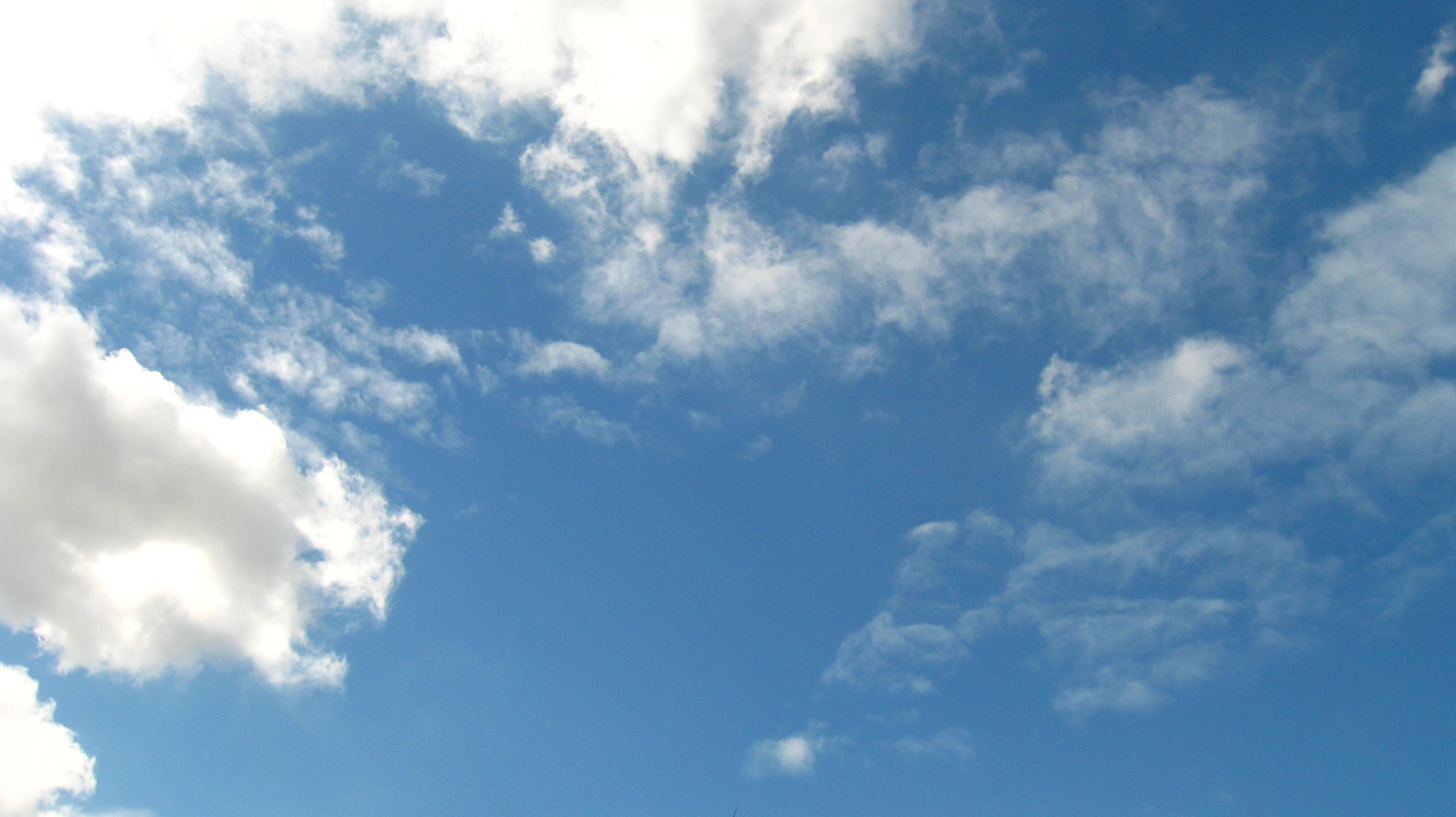
White cumulus clouds appeared over Dhaka, Bangladesh, when significant flooding was underway in many parts of the country.

Along with pressure tendency, the condition of the sky is one of the more important parameters used to forecast weather in mountainous areas. Thickening of cloud cover or the invasion of a higher cloud deck is indicative of rain in the near future. At night, high thin cirrostratus clouds can lead to halos around the Moon, which indicate the approach of a warm front and its associated rain. Morning fog portends fair conditions and can be associated with a marine layer, an indication of a stable atmosphere. Rainy conditions are preceded by wind or clouds which prevent fog formation. The approach of a line of thunderstorms could indicate the approach of a cold front. Cloud-free skies are indicative of fair weather for the near future. The use of sky cover in weather prediction has led to various weather lore over the centuries.

=== Tropical cyclones ===
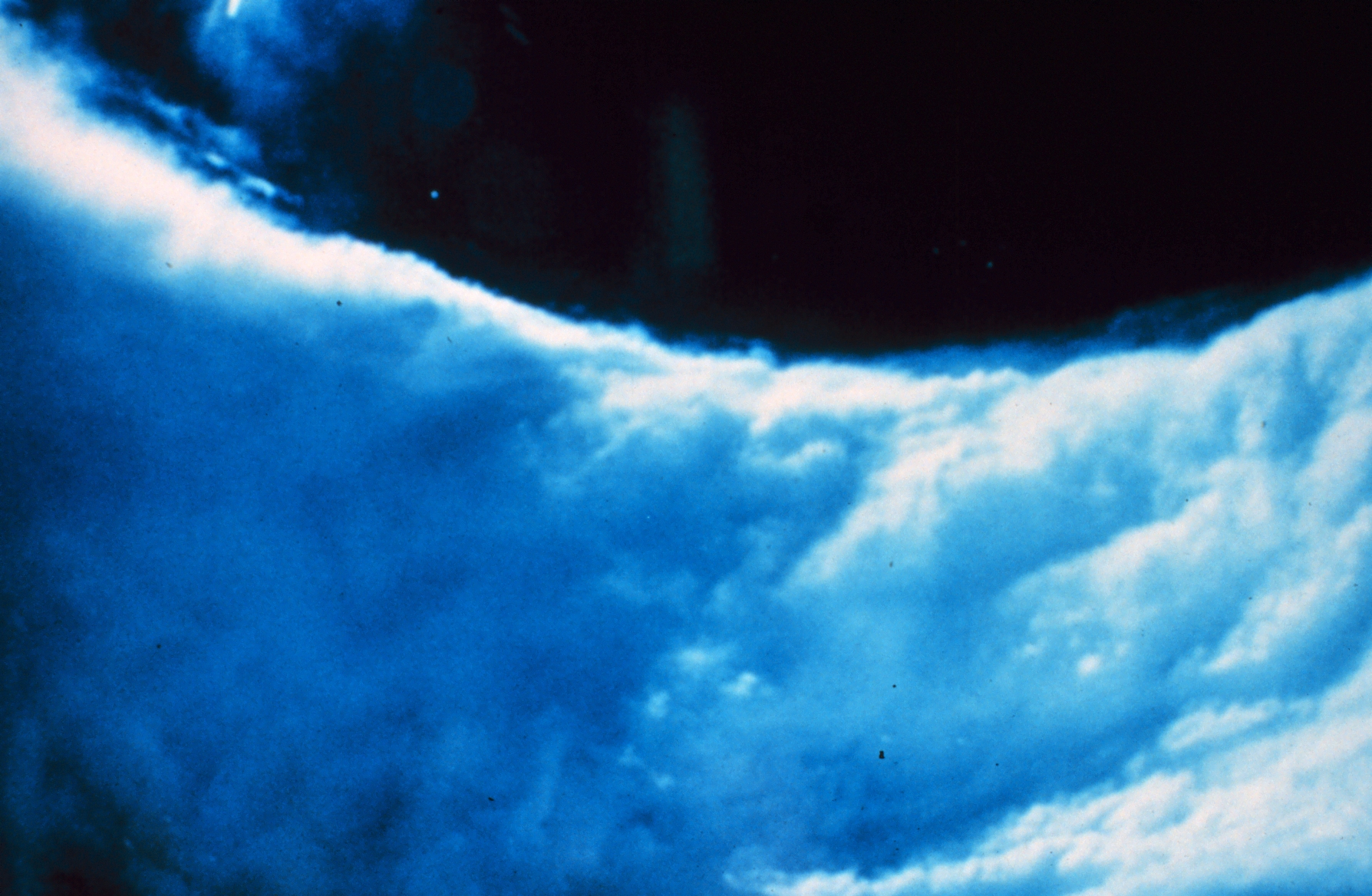
Picture of the sky in the eye of a tropical cyclone

Within 36 hours of the passage of a tropical cyclone's center, the pressure begins to fall and a veil of white cirrus clouds approaches from the cyclone's direction. Within 24 hours of the closest approach to the center, low clouds begin to move in, also known as the bar of a tropical cyclone, as the barometric pressure begins to fall more rapidly and the winds begin to increase. Within 18 hours of the center's approach, squally weather is common, with sudden increases in wind accompanied by rain showers or thunderstorms. Within six hours of the center's arrival, rain becomes continuous. Within an hour of the center, the rain becomes very heavy and the highest winds within the tropical cyclone are experienced. When the center arrives with a strong tropical cyclone, weather conditions improve and the sun becomes visible as the eye moves overhead. Once the system departs, winds reverse and, along with the rain, suddenly increase. One day after the center's passage, the low overcast is replaced with a higher overcast, and the rain becomes intermittent. By 36 hours after the center's passage, the high overcast breaks and the pressure begins to level off.

== Use in transportation ==
Flight is the process by which an object moves through or beyond the sky (as in the case of spaceflight), whether by generating aerodynamic lift, propulsive thrust, aerostatically using buoyancy, or by ballistic movement, without any direct mechanical support from the ground. The engineering aspects of flight are studied in aerospace engineering which is subdivided into aeronautics, which is the study of vehicles that travel through the air, and astronautics, the study of vehicles that travel through space, and in ballistics, the study of the flight of projectiles. While human beings have been capable of flight via hot air balloons since 1783, other species have used flight for significantly longer. Animals, such as birds, bats, and insects are capable of flight. Spores and seeds from plants use flight, via use of the wind, as a method of propagating their species.

== Significance in mythology ==
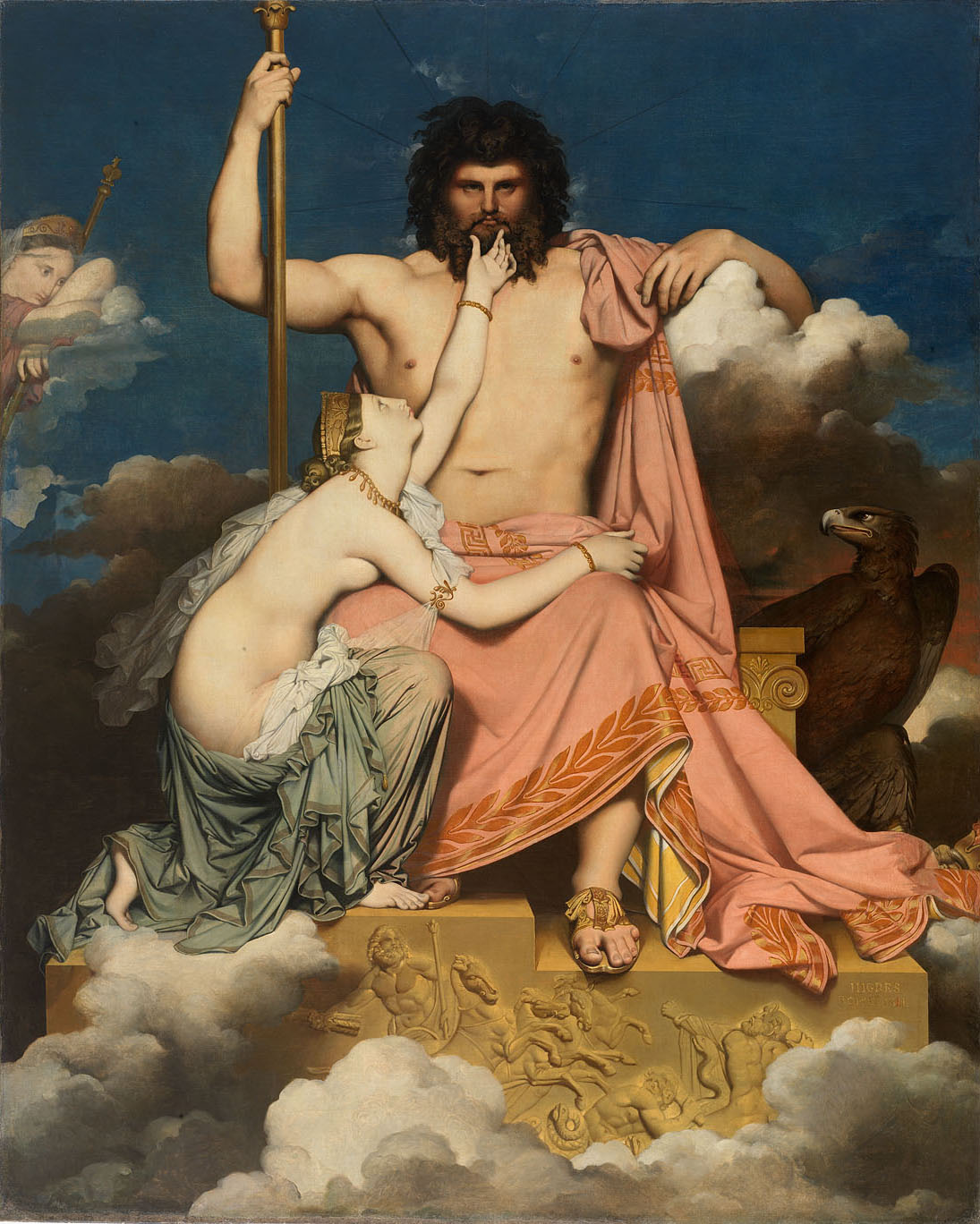
Jupiter, Ancient Roman sky deity

Many mythologies have deities especially associated with the sky. In Egyptian religion, the sky was deified as the goddess Nut and as the god Horus. Dyeus is reconstructed as the god of the sky, or the sky personified, in Proto-Indo-European religion, whence Zeus, the god of the sky and thunder in Greek mythology and the Roman god of sky and thunder Jupiter.

In Australian Aboriginal mythology, Altjira (or Arrernte) is the main sky god and also the creator god. In Iroquois mythology, Atahensic was a sky goddess who fell down to the ground during the creation of the Earth. Many cultures have drawn constellations between stars in the sky, using them in association with legends and mythology about their deities.

== See also ==
- Cyanometer
- Archaeoastronomy
