= Cornelia Lüdecke =

German polar researcher and author

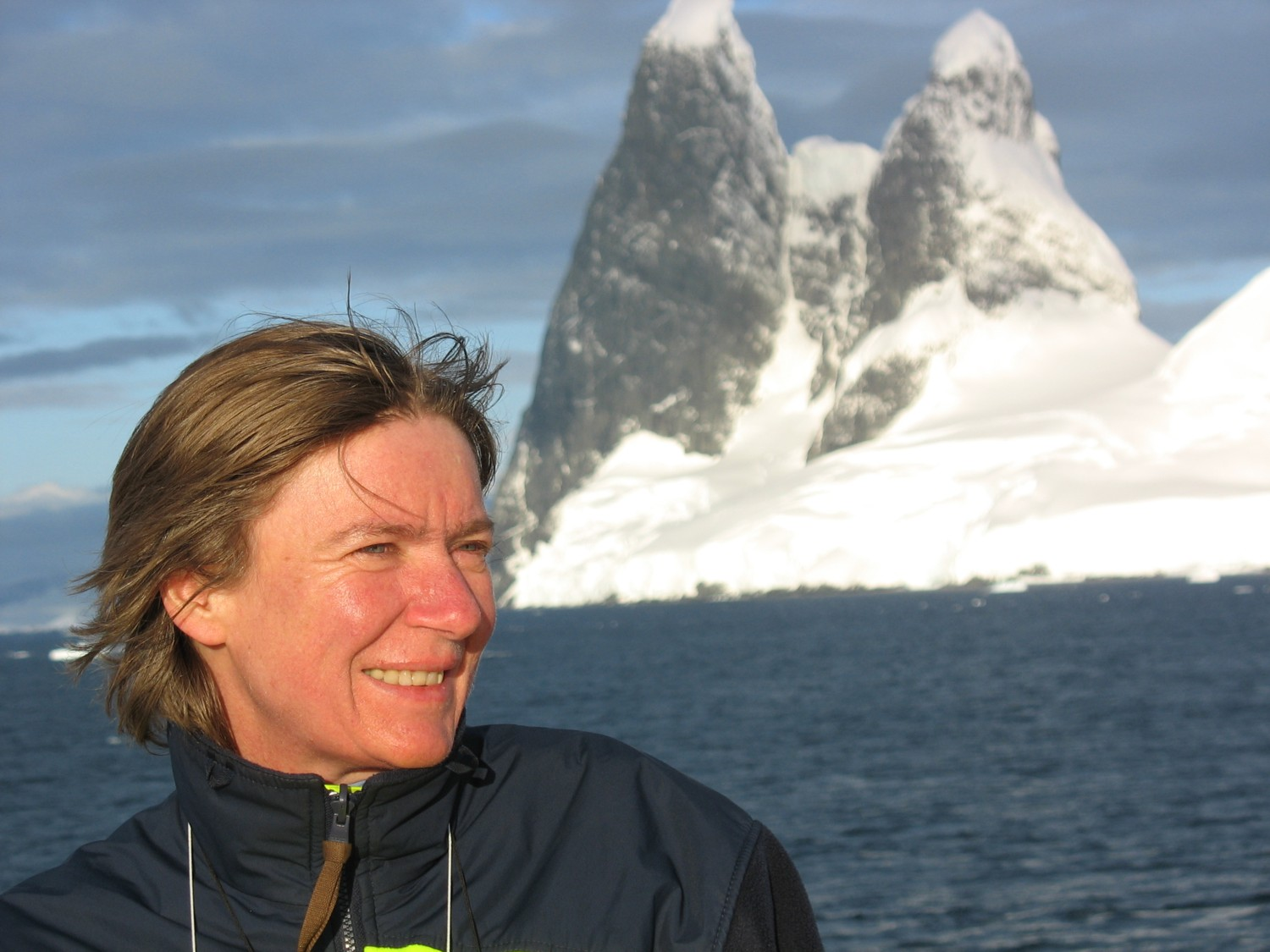
- Lüdecke at the Lemaire Channel
- Born: 1954 (age 71–72)
- Education: LMU Munich
- Awards: Reinhard Süring Medal
- Scientific career
- Fields: Meteorology; Polar history
- Workplaces: University of Hamburg

Cornelia Lüdecke (born 1954) is a German polar researcher and author. A leading figure in the history of German polar research and the history of meteorology and oceanography, she founded the Expert Group on History of Antarctic Research within the Scientific Committee on Antarctic Research (SCAR), institutionalising historical study and reflection for the Antarctic scientific community. Her books, among others, about the Schwabenland Expedition to Antarctica during the Third Reich and Germans in the Antarctic (German: Deutsche in der Antarktis) are milestones in the history of polar research publications.

== Early life and education ==
Lüdecke was born in 1954 in Munich, Germany; her Grandfather August Lüdecke-Cleve and father August Lüdecke were painters, her mother a violinist. Her interest in physics and nature rather than the arts led her to study meteorology at LMU Munich, receiving her diploma in 1980. While doing a literature review on the physical properties of sea ice for MAN Neue Technologie AG, she learned more about polar exploration from her colleagues who had overwintered at the Georg von Neumayer Station, Germany's Antarctic science station. Increasingly fascinated by polar research, Lüdecke decided to study the history of earth sciences at LMU's Institute for History of Natural Sciences while working part-time for MAN. After giving birth to two daughters in 1990 and 1992, in 1994 she submitted her PhD thesis on German Polar research since the turn of the century and the influence of Erich von Drygalski (German: Die deutsche Polarforschung seit der Jahrhundertwende und der Einfluß Erich von Drygalskis). Lüdecke completed her second thesis (Habilitation) titled Chapters from the history of earth-sciences – protagonists, theses, institutions at the Centre for History of Natural Sciences, Mathematics and Technology at the University of Hamburg in 2002 and attained the title "Privatdozent" in 2003.

== Career and impact ==
After her studies Lüdecke participated in meteorological experiments on ships and aircraft including research vessels RS Gauss (II) (de) and RS Meteor (II). She was also a staff member of the operation centers of international meteorological experiments ALPEX in the Alps and EMEX (Equatorial Mesoscale Experiment) in Australia's Northern Territory. Lüdecke teaches history of meteorology and history of polar research at the University of Hamburg.

In 1991 Lüdecke founded the History of Polar Research Working Group of the German Society of Polar Research which she now heads. In 1995 she became chair of the History of Meteorology Specialist Group of the German Meteorological Society. After the establishment of the International Commission on History of Meteorology in 2001, Lüdecke was elected vice-president and was president from 2006–2009. Since 2002, she has been a member of the International Polar Heritage Committee of the International Council of Monuments and Sites.

In 2004 Lüdecke founded the Expert Group on History of Antarctic Research within the Scientific Committee on Antarctic Research (SCAR), for which she is the Chief Officer. She organizes conferences or sessions during the bi-annual SCAR Open Science Conferences. Since 2012 she has been one of the Vice-Presidents of the International Commission on History of Oceanography. During the opening of the Antarctic Treaty Summit on the occasion of the 50th anniversary of the Antarctic Treaty in 2009 Lüdecke gave the historical talk on "Parallel Precedents for the Antarctic Treaty".

For SCAR's first Antarctic and Southern Ocean Science Horizon Scan in April 2014, Lüdecke was among 75 scientists and policy-makers from 22 countries to identify the 80 most important scientific research topics concerning for the next two decades.

She became professor at the University of Hamburg in 2016.

Lüdecke is a member of the curatory of the Academia Dominator. She is also active on the scientific board of the German Society of Polar Research and the Geographical Society in Munich. Lüdecke is member of the editorial boards of several scientific journals, including Polarforschung, Polar Record, Journal of Northern Studies, The Polar Journal, Revista Electrónica Estudios Hemisféricos y Polares, and Earth Sciences History. Lüdecke has organized numerous national and international workshops and conferences on the history of polar research and the history of meteorology.

== Awards and honours ==
In 2010 Lüdecke received the Reinhard Süring Medal from the German Meteorological Society for her "long-time dedicated activities in research and teaching in the field of history of natural sciences (especially of meteorology) and the successful organization of numerous national and international symposia". In 2012 she was elected as corresponding member of the International Academy of the History of Science in Paris. In March 2019 Lüdecke received the Paulus-Preis award for History of Meteorology from the German Meteorological Society.

== Selected publications ==
Lüdecke has published 19 books and proceedings and over 180 papers and book chapters.

- Lüdecke, C.: Deutsche in der Antarktis: Expeditionen und Forschungen vom Kaiserreich bis heute. (Germans in the Antarctic: Expeditions and Research from the Empire until today). Berlin: Ch. Links Verlag 2015.
- Lüdecke, C. (ed.): Eine Entdeckungsreise in die Südpolarregion 1839 - 1843 (James Clark Ross, a journey of discovery in the south polar region). Wiesbaden: Edition Erdmann marixverlag, 2014 (448 pp).
- Lüdecke, C., 2009, "Expanding to Antarctica - Discussions about German naming and a new map of Antarctica in the early 1950s". In: C. Lüdecke (ed.), 2nd SCAR "Workshop on the History of Antarctic Research. Multidimensional exploration of Antarctica around the 1950s". Boletín Chileno Antartico, Instituto Chileno Antártico, Punta Arenas, 45–52.
- Lüdecke, C. (ed.): Steps of Foundation of Institutionalized Antarctic Research. Proceedings of the 1st SCAR Workshop on the History of Antarctic Research, Munich 2–3 June 2005, Reports on Polar and Marine Research = Reports on polar and marine research, Alfred Wegener Institute of Polar and Marine Research, Bremerhaven, no. 560 (2007 ) (228 pp).
- Lüdecke, C.: Roald Amundsen. Ein biografisches Portrait. (Roald Amundsen. A Biographical Portrait). Freiburg: Herder Verlag 2011 (208 S.).
- Barr, Susan, and Cornelia Lüdecke (eds): The History of the International Polar Years (IPYs). Berlin, Heidelberg: Springer (Series: From Pole to Pole; Vol. 1) 2010 (319 pp.).
- Lüdecke, C., and C. Summerhayes, 2012, The Third Reich in Antarctica: The German Antarctic Expedition 1938–39. Eccles: Erskine Press and Bluntisham: Bluntisham Books, 259 pp.
- Lüdecke, C., Die deutsche Polarforschung seit der Jahrhundertwende und der Einfluß Erich von Drygalskis (The German polar research since the turn of the century and the influence of Erich von Drygalski). Berichte zur Polarforschung Reports on polar research, Bremerhaven, no. 158, XIV (1995) (340 S., 72 S. Appendix).
