= Global Challenge Award =

The Global Challenge Award is an online science and engineering design program for pre-college school students (e.g. middle school through high school) from all over the world. It is an initiative that started with a partnership with the University of Vermont in collaboration with the National Science Foundation, currently funded by the MacArthur Foundation Digital Media and Learning program as well as other foundations and corporations, wherein students have the opportunity to form teams with international counterparts and work towards a solution to mitigate global warming and help envision the future of renewable energy. The program is an online educational environment that uses game based learning, simulation and Web-based science resources in a global competition. It relies on the personal initiative and creativity of students working in diverse teams. The access to the project via the Web makes it possible for students, parents, homeschooling families, teachers and interested global community members to get involved to help young people with their creative ideas for innovation in new forms of energy, conservation and increased productivity.

== History ==
Founded in 2005 by Craig Deluca and David Rocchio of the Arno Group and Biddle Duke, the publisher of the Stowe Reporter newspaper company in Stowe, Vt., working in close partnership with Domenico Grasso of The University of Vermont (see) College of Engineering and Mathematical Sciences, the program gives international student teams the opportunity to experience the excitement of scientific understanding and engineering design while working on significant human and societal issues – bringing science to life in innovative new applications. The program mission is to "give students the tools and confidence to solve global problems together."

The overarching model for the learning experiences offered worldwide to any student was influenced by The George Lucas Foundation's Big ideas For Better Schools, the Partnership for 21st Century Schools and game based learning. The Global Challenge was funded in part by a National Science Foundation award from the Innovative Technology Experiences for Students (ITEST) program, validating the project's design for engaging youth in science, technology, engineering and mathematics learning.

Since its founding in 2005, The Global Challenge has reached over 100,000 people worldwide and engaged over 4,000 students from 60 countries in forming teams to solve the challenge. About $200,000 in scholarships, travel, summer study have been provided to over 200 students from 10 countries.

== International connections ==
The Global Challenge Award is responsible for identification of high school students who represent the United States in the International Earth Science Olympiad or IESO. Students and teachers travel to South Korea in 2007 and the Philippines in 2008. Plans are now underway to form a US-IESO selection process with the support of the American Geological Institute.

In addition, the design of the program builds international student teams. Students from over 79 countries participate each year. Top countries by participation with over 100 students each year have been the United States, India, China, and South Korea.

== Program elements ==
There are several project areas in the Challenge. Some are designed specifically for teams, others students can work on alone. Students can mix and match projects based on their interest level and time. They can form a team to compete in one competition and, at the same time, work on individual points.

- Global Business Plan Students build an international team, envision a global solution, create a detailed business plan, and submit it for judging.
- Technical Innovation Plan Students build an international team, envision any kind of technical solution, explain it to a panel of judges.
- Explorations Students work on their own on science, technology, engineering and mathematics units of study called "challenges."
- Green Earth Corps Students work on their own or with any team, build a home and business auditing service, earn while they learn and serve.
- GCA-350 Students create an awareness event about the need to reach "350 parts per million" of CO_{2} in the atmosphere.

Each Challenge earns certain points, and in the end, teams with the highest scores win and earn scholarships, travel awards to the Governor's Institute on Engineering in Vermont, cash prizes, and tuition scholarships.

== News coverage ==
The program was the lead story "Save the World" in Learning & Leading with Technology November 2007. In the Burlington Free Press in July 2008, and has led to a number of youth-authored articles on Cogito.org, for example: Using Nanotechnology for Cost Effective Converters as well as Educating Myself, International Style.

== See also ==
- List of earth sciences awards
