= Barring =

Barring may refer to:

- Barring (music), a guitar playing technique
- Barring engine, forms part of the installation of a large stationary steam engine
- Barring order, an order used by a court to protect a person, object, business, company, state, country, establishment, or entity, and the general public, in a situation involving alleged domestic violence, child abuse, assault, harassment, stalking, or sexual assault.
- Overlaying a bar or stroke diacritic onto a grapheme

== See also ==
- Bar (disambiguation)
- Banning
