= Bar =

Bar or BAR may refer to:

== Food and drink ==
- Bar (establishment), selling alcoholic beverages
- Bar (food), type of food
  - Candy bar
  - Chocolate bar
  - Granola bar
  - Protein bar

== Science and technology ==
=== Earth and space ===
- Bar (river morphology), a deposit of sediment
- Sandbar
- Bar (tropical cyclone), a layer of cloud
- Bar (unit), a unit of pressure
- Bar (galaxy), a feature of many spiral galaxies

=== Computing ===
- Bar (computer science), a placeholder name in programming
- Base Address Register in PCI
- Bar, a mobile phone form factor
- Bar, a type of graphical control element
- Space bar, a keyboard key

=== Biology and kinesiology ===
- BAR domain, in molecular biology
- Barbell, a long object lifted for exercise
- Chin-up bar, fitness equipment in playgrounds and elsewhere
- Horizontal bar, a gymnastic apparatus
- Spreader bar, an article of bondage equipment

=== Other uses in science and technology ===
- Bennett acceptance ratio in thermodynamics
- Bar stock, a form of raw purified metal used in industry
- Crash bar, a door opening mechanism
- Crowbar, a prying tool
- Digging bar, a tool
- Rebar, steel reinforcement, used in construction
- Torsion bar or torsion spring, a device that stores mechanical energy through twisting

== Typography and language ==
- Fraction bar
- Vertical bar or pipe, a punctuation symbol
- Underbar, a line under a formula or segment of text
- Overbar, a line over a formula or segment of text
- Bar (diacritic), a line through a letter
- X-bar theory, in linguistics
- Bavarian language (ISO 639-3 code "bar")

== Business and law ==
- Gold bar, a storage form of gold
- Business Analysis and Reporting in the Uniform Certified Public Accountant Examination
- Bar (law), the legal profession
- Bar association
- Bar examination

== Arts and media ==
=== Television ===
- Bar (Croatian TV series)
- Bar (Czech TV series)
- Bar (Polish TV series)
- Bar (Slovenian TV series)

=== Dance and music ===
- Bar (dance), Turkey
- Bar (music) or measure, segment bounded by vertical lines
- Chime bar, a musical instrument
- "Bar" (song), 2021 single by Tini featuring L-Gante, from Cupido (2023)
- B.A.R. (Bay Area Representatives), 2014 album by Lil Wyte and Frayser Boy

=== Literature ===
- Bay Area Reporter, a newspaper
- Biblical Archaeology Review, a magazine
- British Archaeological Reports, a book series

== Places ==
=== Asia ===
==== Iran ====
- Bar, Bushehr, a village
- Bar, Hormozgan, a village
- Bar, Razavi Khorasan, a city

==== Other uses in asia ====
- Bar, Rutog County, Tibet, China
- Bar Region, Punjab, Pakistan
- Bar, Republic of Buryatia, Russia

=== Europe ===
==== France ====
- Bar (Ardennes river)
- Bar, Corrèze, a commune
- Bar-le-Duc, a commune formerly known as "Bar"
- Bar-sur-Aube, a commune
- Bar-sur-Seine, a commune
- Duchy of Bar, part of the Holy Roman Empire

==== Other uses in europe ====
- Bár, Hungary, a village
- Bar Municipality, Montenegro
  - Bar, Montenegro, a town
- Bar, Ukraine, a town

=== North America ===
- Barbados (IOC and UNDP country code BAR)

=== Solar System ===
- Bar (Martian crater)

== Transportation ==
=== Cars ===
- Bumper bar, a structure on the front and back
- Sway bar, a part of the suspension
- Torsion bar suspension
- California Bureau of Automotive Repair, a consumer protection agency

=== Trains ===
- Bangor and Aroostook Railroad, Maine, US (reporting mark BAR)
- Barstow Harvey House, California, US (Amtrak station code BAR)

=== Other transportation ===
- Qionghai Bo'ao Airport (IATA code BAR)

== Motorsports ==
- British American Racing, a Formula One constructor
- BlackArts Racing Team, a motor racing team from Hong Kong

== Military ==
- Medal bar, additional award
- Bar (heraldry), a band across a shield
- M1918 Browning automatic rifle
- Browning BAR, a Belgian rifle
- Blaauwberg Armoured Regiment, South African Army
- Bar Confederation, an 18th-century Polish association

== Other uses ==
- Bar (Aramaic), a patronymic prefix in Aramaic
- Bar (name)
- Hebrew: בַּר, romanized: bar, lit. 'son of', such as in Bar Mitzvah, a Jewish coming of age ceremony
- "Bar", a name for some gatehouses

== See also ==
- Bär (disambiguation)
- The Bar (disambiguation)
- Barr (disambiguation)
- Barre (disambiguation)
- Bars (disambiguation)
- Barbar (disambiguation)
- FUBAR (disambiguation)
