= Roger Revelle Prize =

The Roger Revelle Prize is a prize given out by the Scripps Institution of Oceanography to people who have made outstanding contributions that advance or promote scientific research in fields such as oceanography, climatology and other planetary sciences. This prize is named for Roger Revelle, a scientist who served as director of the Scripps Institution of Oceanography and was instrumental in the founding of the University of California, San Diego. He was an important oceanographer and a pioneer in climate change research.

The inaugural recipient of this prize was Al Gore, the former vice president of the United States. He was awarded the prize on 6 March 2009 for his efforts to bring climate change and environmental issues to a worldwide audience. The second recipient of this prize was Prince Albert of Monaco. He was awarded the prize on 23 October 2009 for his efforts to promote scientific research and protection of the environment.

== See also ==
- List of earth sciences awards
