= National Collegiate Weather Forecasting Contest =

The National Collegiate Weather Forecasting Contest, or NCWFC, was a yearly competition among colleges and Universities in the US run by Penn State. There were over 1000 participants from about 45 institutions. In 2006, the competition was transferred to the University of Oklahoma and run as the WxChallenge.

== Organization ==
Entrants in the contest must be affiliated with a college or university, but they range in age and knowledge from undergraduates to professors. Each year, 13 cities are picked for forecasting; the current city changes every 2 weeks. Contestants forecast 4 days per week for the following day's high temperature (in Fahrenheit), low temperature, and precipitation (forecast by category).

The precipitation categories are:

- 0 -- no precipitation or trace
- 1 -- trace - 0.05", liquid water equivalent, inclusive
- 2 -- 0.06-0.24", inclusive
- 3 -- 0.25-0.49", inclusive
- 4 -- 0.50-0.99", inclusive
- 5 -- >=1.00"

One "error" point is given for each degree of error on temperature, and 4 error points are given for each error in precipitation category.

== Winners ==
- 2001-2005: Massachusetts Institute of Technology
- 2006: San Jose State University

== See also ==
- List of meteorology awards
