= List of earth sciences awards =

This list of earth sciences awards is an index to articles on notable awards for earth sciences, or natural science related to the planet Earth. It includes awards for meteorology, oceanography and paleontology, but excludes awards for environmental science, geography, geology and geophysics, which are covered by separate lists.

== General ==
Country	Award	Sponsor	Description
Australia	Dorothy Hill Medal	Australian Academy of Science	Research in the Earth sciences by women researchers up to 10 years post PhD
United States	F.W. Clarke Medal	Geochemical Society	Early-career scientist for a single outstanding contribution to geochemistry or cosmochemistry
United States	Global Challenge Award	University of Vermont, National Science Foundation	Program for pre-college school students to work towards a solution to mitigate global warming and help envision the future of renewable energy
United States	GSA Public Service Award	Geological Society of America	Contributions that have materially enhanced the public's understanding of the earth sciences, or significantly served decision makers in the application of scientific and technical information in public affairs and public policy related to the earth sciences.
India	Krishnan Medal	Indian Geophysical Union	Outstanding geophysicist/geologist whose age does not exceed 40 years
United States	Leidy Award	Academy of Natural Sciences of Drexel University	Excellence in publications, explorations, discoveries or research in the natural sciences
United States	Meinzer Award	Geological Society of America	Publication or body of publications that have significantly advanced the science of hydrogeology or a closely related field
Chile	National Prize for Natural Sciences	National Prize for Sciences (Chile)	Natural sciences
United States	Nemmers Prize in Earth Sciences	Northwestern University	Contributions of lasting significance to the field of earth sciences
United States	Roger Revelle Prize	Scripps Institution of Oceanography	Outstanding contributions that advance or promote scientific research in fields such as oceanography, climatology and other planetary sciences
United Kingdom	Seligman Crystal	International Glaciological Society	Outstanding scientific contribution to glaciology so that the subject is now enriched
United States	Vetlesen Prize	Lamont-Doherty Earth Observatory	Scientific achievement that results in a clearer understanding of the Earth, its history, or its relation to the universe

== Meteorology ==
Country	Award	Sponsor	Description
Netherlands	Buys Ballot Medal	Royal Netherlands Academy of Arts and Sciences	Individual who has made significant contributions to meteorology
United States	Carl-Gustaf Rossby Research Medal	American Meteorological Society	Individual atmospheric scientists
United States	Fawbush-Miller Award	United States Air Force	Most outstanding operational weather squadron for the entire Air Force
Russia	Friedmann Prize	Russian Academy of Sciences	Outstanding work in cosmology and gravity
Switzerland	International Meteorological Organization Prize	World Meteorological Organization	Outstanding contributions in the field of meteorology and, since 1971, the field of operational hydrology
United States	Jule G. Charney Award	American Meteorological Society	Highly significant research or development achievement in the atmospheric or hydrologic sciences
United States	National Collegiate Weather Forecasting Contest	Pennsylvania State University	Weather forecasting competition among colleges in North America. Replaced by the WxChallenge
Canada	Patterson Medal	Meteorological Service of Canada	Residents of Canada for services rendered to meteorology
Germany	Reinhard Süring Medal	German Meteorological Society	Outstanding scientific and organizational contributions to the objectives of the DMG
United States	Sverdrup Gold Medal	American Meteorological Society	Outstanding contributions to the scientific knowledge of interactions between the oceans and the atmosphere
United Kingdom	Symons Gold Medal	Royal Meteorological Society	Distinguished work in the field of meteorological science
Europe	Vilhelm Bjerknes Medal	European Geosciences Union	Distinguished research in atmospheric sciences
United Kingdom	William Gaskell Medal	Royal Meteorological Society	Scientist who has distinguished himself in the field of experimental meteorology
United States	WxChallenge	University of Oklahoma	Weather forecasting competition among colleges in North America

== Oceanography ==
Country	Award	Sponsor	Description
(international)	A.C. Redfield Lifetime Achievement Award	Association for the Sciences of Limnology and Oceanography	Major, long-term, achievements in limnology and oceanography
United States	Alexander Agassiz Medal	National Academy of Sciences	Original contribution in the science of oceanography
United States	B H Ketchum Award	Woods Hole Oceanographic Institution	Innovative coastal/nearshore research
United States	Bigelow Medal	Woods Hole Oceanographic Institution	Oceanography
(international)	G. Evelyn Hutchinson Award	Association for the Sciences of Limnology and Oceanography	Mid-career scientist for excellence in any aspect of limnology or oceanography
United States	Hans Hass Award	Historical Diving Society (United States)	Recognition of contribution made to the advancement of our knowledge of the ocean
United States	Jerlov Award	The Oceanography Society	Contribution made to the advancement of our knowledge of the nature and consequences of light in the ocean
United States	Henry Stommel Research Award	American Meteorological Society	Outstanding contributions to the advancement of the understanding of the dynamics and physics of the ocean
United States	Mary Sears Women Pioneers in Oceanography	Woods Hole Oceanographic Institution	Lifetime achievement and impact
United States	Walter Munk Medal (formerly Walter Munk Award)	The Oceanography Society	Distinguished research in oceanography related to sound and the sea
(international)	Yentsch-Schindler Award	Association for the Sciences of Limnology and Oceanography	Outstanding contributions by an early career scientist to aquatic sciences

== Paleontology ==
Country	Award	Sponsor	Description
United States	Charles Schuchert Award	Paleontological Society	Person under 40 whose work reflects excellence and promise in the science of paleontology
United Kingdom	Lapworth Medal	Palaeontological Association	Those who have made a significant contribution to the science by means of a substantial body of research
United States	Leidy Award	Academy of Natural Sciences of Drexel University	Excellence in publications, explorations, discoveries or research in the natural sciences
United States	Paleontological Society Medal	Paleontological Society	Person whose eminence is based on advancement of knowledge in paleontology
United Kingdom	Palaeontographical Society Medal	Palaeontographical Society	Sustained and important series of contributions to the taxonomic and systematic palaeontology of Great Britain and Ireland, especially those which address problems of palaeogeography, palaeoecology and phylogeny
United States	Raymond C. Moore Medal	Society for Sedimentary Geology	Persons who have made significant contributions in the field which have promoted the science of stratigraphy by research in paleontology and evolution and the use of fossils for interpretations of paleoecology
United States	Romer-Simpson Medal	Society of Vertebrate Paleontology	Sustained and outstanding scholarly excellence and service to the discipline of vertebrate paleontology
United States	Charles Doolittle Walcott Medal	National Academy of Sciences	Individual achievement in advancing knowledge of Cambrian or Precambrian life and its history

== See also ==
- Lists of awards
- List of environmental awards
- List of geography awards
- List of geology awards
- List of geophysics awards
