= WxChallenge =

The WxChallenge is a weather forecasting competition among colleges in North America. The competition is run by the University of Oklahoma. In its first official semester, fall 2006, there were 1,262 participants from 53 institutions. A similar competition, the National Collegiate Weather Forecasting Contest, recently ended, partially due to this competition.

== Organization ==
Entrants in the contest must be affiliated with a college or university, but they range in age and knowledge from undergraduates to professors. Each semester, 5 cities are picked for forecasting; the current city changes every 2 weeks. Contestants forecast 4 days per week for the following day's high temperature (in Fahrenheit), low temperature, maximum sustained wind speed (in knots) and precipitation (in 1/100ths of an inch).

One "error" point is given for each degree of error on temperature, 1/2 an error point is given for each knot of wind speed error.

Precipitation is scored as follows:

- 0.4 points for each .01 inch of error in the verification range from 0.00 to 0.10 inches inclusive
- 0.3 points for each .01 inch of error in the verification range from 0.11 to 0.25 inches inclusive
- 0.2 points for each .01 inch of error in the verification range from 0.26 to 0.50 inches inclusive
- 0.1 points for each .01 inch of error in the verification range over 0.50 inches

At the end of the competition, the top 64 forecasters continue into a "March Madness" like tournament where a champion is crowned. A trophy is given to the champion, as well as the runner-up and the other two forecasters who make it to the "Final Four".

== Winners ==
- 2006-07: Massachusetts Institute of Technology
- 2007-08: Massachusetts Institute of Technology
- 2008-09: Mississippi State University
- 2009-10: Mississippi State University
- 2010-11: Mississippi State University
- 2011-12: Pennsylvania State University
- 2012-13: Pennsylvania State University
- 2013-14: Pennsylvania State University
- 2014-15: Pennsylvania State University
- 2015-16: Pennsylvania State University
- 2016-17: Pennsylvania State University
- 2017-18: Colorado State University
- 2018-19: University of Washington
- 2019-20: Colorado State University
- 2020-21: North Carolina State University
- 2021-22: Massachusetts Institute of Technology
- 2022-23: Massachusetts Institute of Technology
- 2023-24: Colorado State University

== See also ==
- List of meteorology awards
