= Bar, Republic of Buryatia =

Bar Бар
- Selo
- Location within Republic of Buryatia Location within Russia
- Coordinates: 51°17′N 107°33′E
- Country: Russia
- Region: Republic of Buryatia
- District: Mukhorshibirsky District
- Time zone: UTC+8:00

Bar (Russian: Бар) is a rural locality (a selo) in Mukhorshibirsky District, Republic of Buryatia, Russia. The population was 466 as of 2010. There are 18 streets.

== Geography ==
Bar is located 37 km northwest of Mukhorshibir (the district's administrative centre) by road. Khoshun-Uzur is the nearest rural locality.
