= Bar (name) =

Bar is a surname and a unisex given name. It may refer to:

== Given name ==
- Bar Tzuf Botzer (born 1994), Israeli tennis player
- Bar Brimer (born 1997), Israeli actor and model
- Bar Paly (born 1985), Israeli-American model and actress
- Bar Refaeli (born 1985), Israeli model
- Bar Soloveychik (born 2000), Israeli swimmer
- Bar Timor (born 1992), Israeli basketball player

== Surname ==
- Alon Bar (born 1966), Israeli/American filmmaker
- Amos Bar (1931–2011), Israeli author, teacher, and editor
- Ellen Bar, New York City Ballet soloist
- Haim Bar (born 1954), Israeli footballer
- Israel Beer (1912–1966), sometimes spelled Yisrael Bar, convicted of espionage by Israel in 1961
- Jacques Bar (1912–2009), French film producer
- Juan Bar (born 1987), Argentine handball player
- Moshe Bar (investor) (born 1971), Israeli technologist and author
- Moshe Bar (neuroscientist), Israeli neuroscientist
- Noma Bar (born 1973), graphic designer
- Ronen Bar (born 1965), Israeli intelligence officer and the director of the Shin Bet (also called Shabak or ISA)
- Sergiu Bar (born 1980), Romanian footballer
- Shirley Temple Bar, Irish drag queen
- Shlomo Bar (born 1943), Israeli musician and social activist
- Shraga Bar (1948–2025), Israeli football player
- Walter Bar (born 1938), Swiss fencer
- Zvi Bar (born 1935), Israeli politician
