= Reinhard Süring Medal =

The Reinhard-Süring Plaque (German: Reinhard-Süring-Plakette) is a scientific award presented by the German Meteorological Society (Deutsche Meteorologische Gesellschaft, DMG) to individuals for outstanding scientific or organisational services to the aims of the society and its predecessor organisations.

== History ==
The plaque is named after German meteorologist Reinhard Süring. The Potsdam Institute for Climate Impact Research notes that awarding a plaque in Süring's name is a tradition introduced in the 1960s. The current DMG regulations describe the Reinhard-Süring Plaque as having been endowed on 1 January 1978 in Potsdam by the Meteorological Society of the German Democratic Republic.

== Awarding ==
According to DMG regulations, the award consists of a medal (plaque) and a certificate and is typically presented in connection with a scientific meeting; it may be awarded to more than one person in the same year. Recipients are selected unanimously by a three-person committee, based on proposals from the DMG executive (Präsidium) or one of its sections.

== Recipients ==
The DMG publishes a list of recipients (from 1995 onward).

- 1995: Joachim Neisser; Siegfried Uhlig
- 1998: Werner Wehry; Tello von Wilamowitz-Moellendorff
- 2001: Konrad Balzer; Christian Hänsel
- 2004: Elke Wolff
- 2007: Christian-Dietrich Schönwiese; Frank Beyrich; Sigurd Schienbein
- 2008: Friedrich-Wilhelm Gerstengarbe
- 2010: Cornelia Lüdecke; Hartmut Graßl
- 2013: Michael Hantel
- 2015: Hans-F. Graf; Hans von Storch
- 2016: Stefan Emeis; Wilhelm Kuttler
- 2019: Helmut Mayer
- 2021: Heinke Schlünzen
- 2022: Armin Raabe
- 2023: Werner Sommer
- 2024: Gudrun Rosenhagen

== See also ==
- List of meteorology awards
