= Innovative Technology Experiences for Students =

Funded by the National Science Foundation, the Innovative Technology Experiences for Students and Teachers (ITEST) program was established in 2003 to address the looming shortage of technology workers in the United States. ITEST engages students and teachers in authentic, hands-on learning experiences in science, technology, engineering, and mathematics (commonly referred to as 'STEM' or 'SET' [more common in the U.K.]).

As of early 2012, the program is in its ninth year. Over 195 individual projects across 43 states have been funded. It has impacted:

- over 225,800 students, grades 6–12
- over 8,000 teachers
- over 3,000 parents and caregivers

The ITEST Learning Resource Center (ITEST LRC) at Education Development Center assists the projects in building bridges between formal and informal learning by facilitating an inclusive community of practice. Findings and lessons learned are shared nationally to improve policy and practice. Visit the website with the link below, or view a 2-page overview (Snapshot).
