= Deh Barez, Chaharmahal and Bakhtiari =

Deh Barez ده بارز
- Village
- Location within Iran
- Coordinates: 31°31′02″N 50°24′05″E
- Country: Iran
- Province: Chaharmahal and Bakhtiari
- County: Lordegan
- Bakhsh: Manj
- Rural District: Barez

Population (2006)
  - Total: 299
- Time zone: UTC+3:30 (IRST)
  - Summer (DST): UTC+4:30 (IRDT)

Deh Barez (Persian: ده بارز, also Romanized as Deh Bārez, Deh-e Bārez, and Deh-e Bārz; also known as Bārs and Bārz Shovār) is a village in Barez Rural District, Manj District, Lordegan County, Chaharmahal and Bakhtiari Province, Iran. At the 2006 census, its population was 299, in 58 families. The village is populated by Lurs.
