= Weather hole =

Location that receives calmer weather than the surrounding areas

A weather hole is a location that receives calmer weather than the surrounding area. It is an area thunderstorms often miss, or near which approaching storms often dissipate.

== Details ==
A 2005 study entitled "Do Meteorologists Suppress Thunderstorms?: Radar-Derived Statistics and the Behavior of Moist Convection" examined 28 target cities and random control points in the U.S. They were compared to their surroundings in order to determine whether these target points were weather holes or the opposite, hot spots. A determination was made by measuring and comparing the convective echoes of the target points with the surrounding area. Only one target was classified as a weather hole, and one was classified as a hot spot. Most selected targets experienced convective echoes as often as their surrounding areas.

According to the a study's authors, the "results suggest that meteorologists are unnecessarily cranky about the frequency of storms in their hometowns." It has been suggested that Grand Forks, ND is a weather hole.
