= BARS apparatus =

Machine for generating synthetic minerals and diamonds

Schematic of a BARS system.

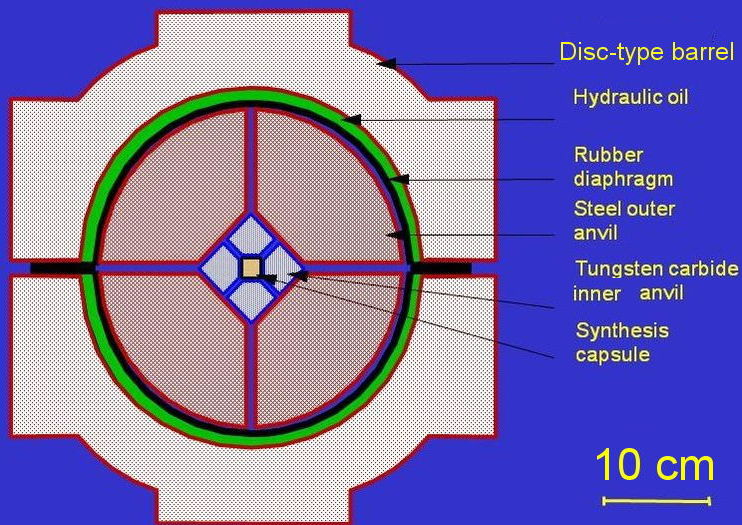
Pressure chamber.

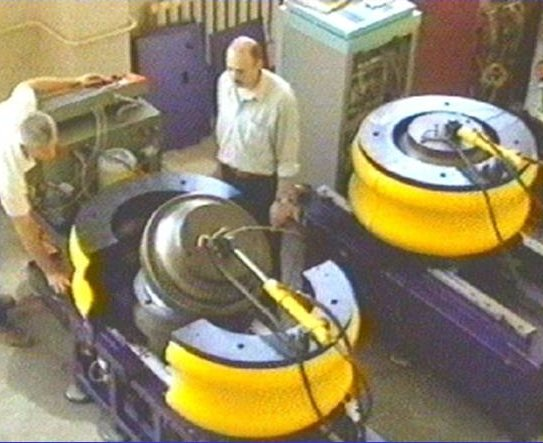
Two BARS devices, one open for loading or unloading and the other closed.

BARS (or "split sphere", transliteration from Russian: БАРС abbreviation of Russian: Беспрессовая Аппаратура Высокого Давления «РАЗРЕЗНАЯ СФЕРА», (bespressovaya apparatura vysokogo davleniya «razreznaya sfera»), "press-free high-pressure setup «split sphere»") a high-pressure high-temperature apparatus usually used for growing or processing minerals, especially diamond and boron nitride. Typical pressures and temperatures achievable with BARS are 10 GPa (99,000 atm) and 2,500 °C (4,530 °F; 2,770 K).

The BARS technology was invented around 1989–1991 by the scientists from the Institute of Geology and Geophysics of the Siberian Branch of the Academy of Sciences of the USSR. In the center of the device, there is a ceramic cylindrical reaction cell of about 2 cm^{3} in size. The cell is placed into a cubic-shaped pressure-transmitting material, which is pressed by elements made from cemented carbide (VK10 hard alloy). The outer octahedral cavity is pressed by 8 steel sectors. After mounting, the whole assembly is locked in a disc-type barrel with a diameter ~1 meter. The barrel is filled with oil, which pressurizes upon heating; the oil pressure is transferred to the central cell. The central cell is heated up by a coaxial graphite heater. Temperature is measured with a thermocouple. The exterior size is 2.2 х 1.0 х 1.2 meters. The weight of the sphere is 2.8 tonnes (6,200 lb), and the claimed energy consumption is in between 1.5 - 2 kWh.

The growth rate for 5 carats (1.0 g) type Ib (yellow, nitrogen-rich) crystals using Fe–Ni catalyst reaches as high as ~20 mg/h towards the end of 100 h growth cycle, i.e. crystals of 5 carats (1.0 g) to 6 carats (1.2 g) can be grown in less than 100 h.

== See also ==
- Synthetic diamond
- Material properties of diamond
- Crystallographic defects in diamond
- Diamond color
- Diamond enhancement
- Diamond
