= Bars, Gers =

Bars
- Commune
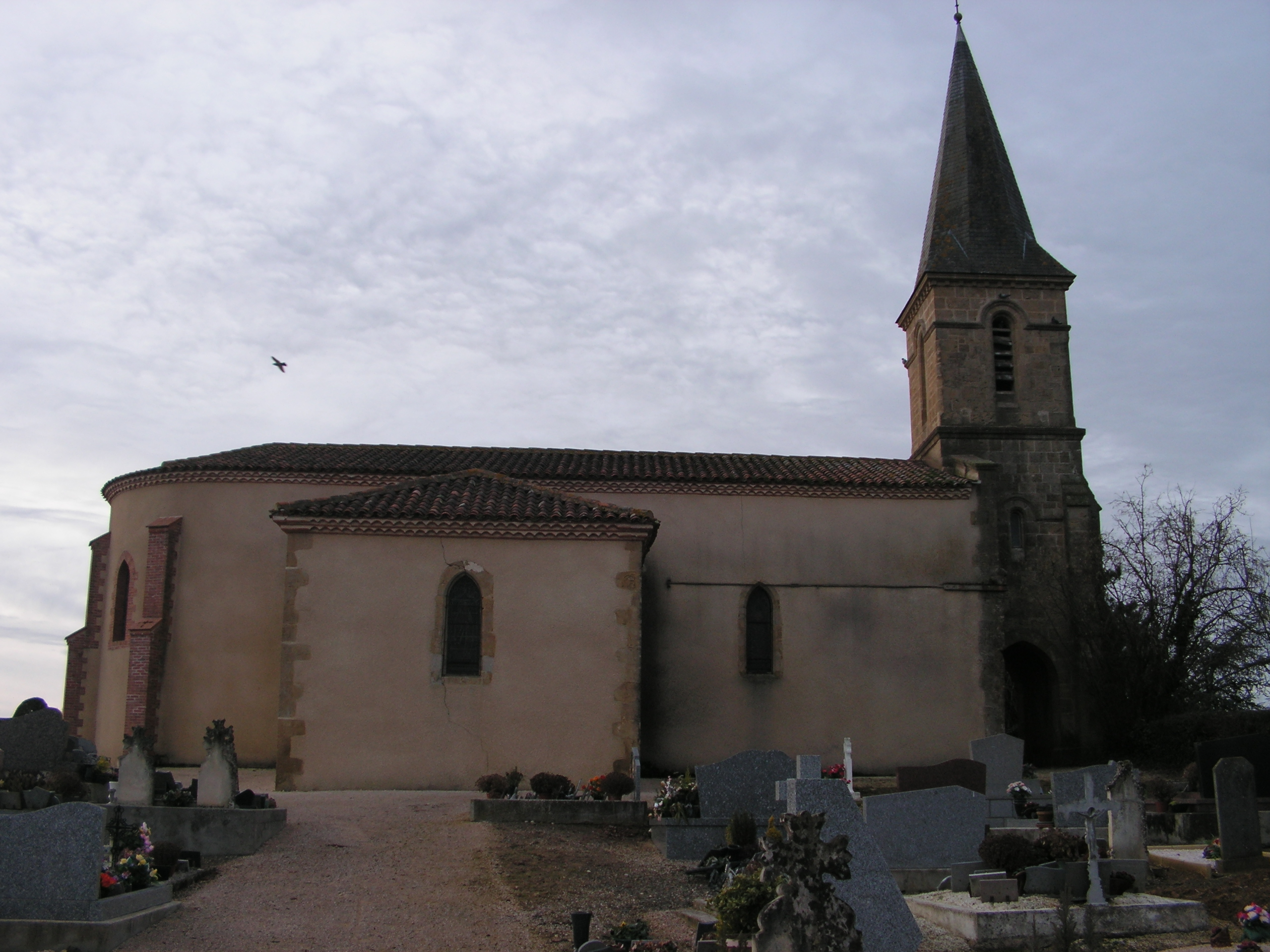
- The church in Bars
- Location of Bars
- Location within France Location within Occitanie
- Coordinates: 43°30′46″N 0°17′42″E
- Country: France
- Region: Occitania
- Department: Gers
- Arrondissement: Mirande
- Canton: Pardiac-Rivière-Basse
- Intercommunality: Cœur d'Astarac en Gascogne

Government
  - Mayor (2020–2026): Régis Balech
- Area^{1}: 10.61 km^{2} (4.10 sq mi)
- Elevation: 250 m (820 ft)
- Highest elevation: 271 m (889 ft)
- Lowest elevation: 170 m (560 ft)
- Population (2023): 123
  - Density: 11.6/km^{2} (30.0/sq mi)
- Time zone: UTC+01:00 (CET)
  - Summer (DST): UTC+02:00 (CEST)
- INSEE/Postal code: 32030 /32300
- ^{1} French Land Register data, which excludes lakes, ponds, glaciers > 1 km^{2} (0.386 sq mi or 247 acres) and river estuaries.

Bars is a commune in the Gers department in southwestern France.

== Geography ==
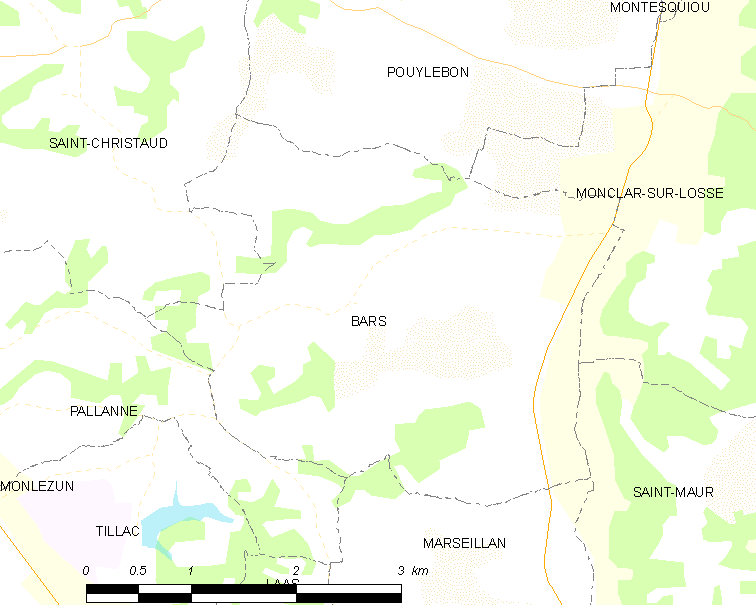
Bars and its surrounding communes

== Population ==
Historical population
Year	Pop.	±% p.a.
1968	184	—
1975	158	−2.15%
1982	137	−2.02%
1990	148	+0.97%
1999	139	−0.69%
2007	132	−0.64%
2012	128	−0.61%
2017	135	+1.07%
2023	123	−1.54%
Source: INSEE

== See also ==
- Communes of the Gers department
