= Bar (tropical cyclone) =

The bar of a mature tropical cyclone is a very dark gray-black layer of cloud that appears to be near to the horizon as seen from an observer preceding the approach of the storm, and is composed primarily of dense stratocumulus clouds. Cumulus and cumulonimbus clouds bearing precipitation follow immediately after the passage of the wall-like bar. Altostratus, cirrostratus and cirrus clouds are usually visible in ascending order above the top of the bar, while the wind direction for an observer facing toward the bar is typically from the left and slightly behind the observer.

== History ==
The dark layer of clouds on the horizon seen prior to a tropical cyclone's passage over a location was first described in 1687 and the observed phenomenon later published in 1697 by William Dampier while observing a typhoon in the South China Sea during a circumnavigation by pirate ship. These observations led to an improved understanding of the nature of tropical cyclones. The use of "bar" as a term to describe this cloud layer first appeared in the 19th century.

== Inside the bar ==
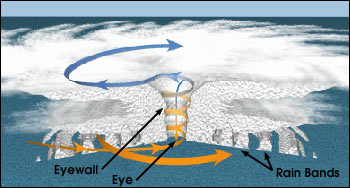
The basic vertical structure of a mature tropical cyclone. The bar appears as the storm's main disk of initially the upper storm clouds followed by the lower clouds as viewed from a distance, and gaps exist in the rainbands after the bar passes over.

When the bar of the storm approaches an observer, it appears stationary in azimuthal position, whereas a storm moving toward the observer at an angle or perpendicular to the observer will appear to drift along the horizon. A reddish tint sometimes appears toward the top of the bar, while the darkness often varies depending on the storm's intensity. Tints of indigo, green, yellow or violet may also be present depending on the time of day due to the prismatic effect of water droplets in the cloud. Cumulus clouds first appear at the outflow boundary of the lower part of the bar. As the bar passes overhead, barometric pressure at the observer's location falls steadily. The first rainband arrives, the clouds moving from left to right roughly along isobar lines, but this is often followed by short periods of relative calm. During the onset of the bar's arrival, winds continuously increase in intensity leading toward the eyewall. Navigators of ships at sea often use the first appearance of a bar to steer clear of the approaching tropical cyclone.

Closer to the center of tropical cyclone, the eyewall also exhibits the appearance of a bar, and high lightning activity occurs within this central bar. After the bar passes through, the strongest winds and often the heaviest precipitation abruptly changes to calmer conditions within the eye, before the eyewall passes over again and the strongest winds arrive from the opposite direction.

At sea, wind speeds typically reach level 8 on the Beaufort scale while waves become drastically higher when the bar reaches overhead and squall lines begin to arrive.
