= KWAN-TEK =

French metrology solutions company

- Company type: Private
- Industry: Metrology
- Founded: 2020
- Founder: Remi Geiger, Breizh Rebond, Société Financière Lorient Développement (SFLD)
- Headquarters: Plœmeur, France
- Website: kwan-tek.com

KWAN-TEK (formerly Wainvam-e) is a French company that specializes in the development and commercialization of metrology solutions based on diamond quantum sensors.

== History ==
In June 2019, Claude Barraud met Remi Geiger. They decided to create a company that specializes in metrology and connects fundamental research to industrial applications (deep tech). Michel Féret and Jianguo Zhang soon joined them. In April 2020, Wainvam-e was formally established.

In July 2020, Wainvam-e opened its new headquarters at the Soye Technology Park in Plœmeur, Brittany, France.

In July 2021, Wainvam-e was awarded by the i-Lab 2021 Innovation Contest, a competition organized by the Ministry of Higher Education, Research, and Innovation in partnership with Bpifrance. The company, then, obtained several innovation grants in particular a deeptech program from Bpifrance.

In October 2023, Wainvam-e, which had entered judicial administration, was acquired by Breizh Rebond and SFLD (Lorient Development Financial Company) and renamed KWAN-TEK. The investors injected 2.2 million euros in cash.

In March 2023, KWAN-TEK was selected for the Techinnov France 2030 contest.

== Activity ==
KWAN-TEK focuses in quantum sensing, leveraging diamond-based quantum sensors exploiting Nitrogen-Vacancy (NV) centers' properties, advancing quantum metrology.

KWAN-TEK pioneers quantum sensor technology for precise measurements of magnetic fields and temperature in research, industry, and defense. KWAN-TEK innovations span quantum education platforms, quantum magnetometers for instrumentation purposes and navigation, and non-destructive testing.

KWAN-TEK aligns with France's quantum strategy, as outlined in the Forteza 2020 report, and receives financial support through the France 2030 program.

== Technology ==
The nitrogen-vacancy center (NV center) in diamond offers versatile spin-dependent photoluminescence, enabling precise electronic spin state measurements via optically detected magnetic resonance. With enduring spin coherence and sensitivity to various stimuli, it serves as a foundation for quantum sensors, advancing fields like quantum computing and spintronics, while also benefiting quantum physics education and non-destructive testing.

== Applications ==
KWAN-TEK's diamond-based quantum sensor technology, is applied across various domains such as high-precision instrumentation, quantum physics education, autonomous navigation (non-GNSS), and industrial control systems such as NDT (Non-Destructive Testing). Utilizing quantum diamond properties such as NV (nitrogen-vacancy) centers, the solutions enable accuracy and reliability in magnetic field sensing and other measurement applications.

== Patents ==
KWAN-TEK holds patents spanning quantum sensing and metrology. These patents encompass diverse methodologies and devices, covering areas such as magnetic field sensing using quantum diamond technology, the utilization of fluorescent probes for precise measurements, and architectures of diamond quantum sensors for Non Destructive Testing applications.
