= Colour centre (disambiguation) =

colour centre may refer to:

- colour centre, a region in the brain
- chromophores
- Nitrogen-vacancy_center in diamond
- Silicon-vacancy center in diamond
