= T centre =

Radiation damage centre in silicon

The T centre is a radiation damage centre in silicon composed of a carbon-carbon pair (C-C) sharing a substitutional site of the silicon lattice. Additionally, one of the substitutional carbon atoms is bonded with a hydrogen atom while the other carbon contains an unpaired electron in the ground state of a dangling bond. Much like the nitrogen-vacancy centres in diamond, the T centre contains spin-dependent optical transitions addressable through photoluminescence. These spin-dependent transitions, however, emit light within the technologically efficient telecommunication O-band. Consequentially, the T centre is an intriguing candidate for quantum information technologies with development of integrated quantum devices benefiting from techniques within the silicon photonic community.

== Structure ==
The T centre is a radiation damage centre in silicon. It contains a substitutional carbon-carbon pair terminated by an additional hydrogen atom within the lattice. This structure also contains a dangling bond on the other substitutional carbon.

Historically, the structure of the T centre was uncovered using spectroscopic measurements. The presence of carbon as the main constituent within the lattice was hypothesized when a shift in the defect's zero phonon line (ZPL) was observed in samples enriched with ^{13}C. Similarly, the presence of hydrogen was determined using a shift in the ZPL in a deuterium defused sample. Splitting within the local vibration modes (LVM) introduced by the presence of ^{13}C from 2 lines into 4 subsequent lines suggested the presence of a second carbon atom. The suggested formation mechanism is, therefore, the capture of an interstitial C-H pair onto a substitutional carbon with a dangling bond predicted by ab initio calculations

External field perturbation measurements are used to determine axial symmetry and orientation of luminescent transitions. Stress-dependent spectral line studies have previously suggested that rhombic I (C_{2v}) symmetry is present within the defect.; however, it was later shown to have monoclinic I (C_{1h}) symmetry. (Note: This revision arose from the observed temperature independent shift in both ^{12}C and ^{13}C isotope ZPLs into 2, 3, and 4 components under axial stress along <100>, <111>, and <110> respectively.) Consequentially, the defect is expected to have 24 orientations, which form 12 optically resolvable orientation pairs under a magnetic field. These have been studied using photoluminescence spectroscopy

== Formation ==
The current formation model for the T centre contains an interstitial carbon capturing a hydrogen atom before migrating to a substitutional site with another carbon during heat treatment between 350 and 600 °C. T centres have been observed in silicon semiconductors grown using the float-zone and Czochralski (CZ) technique as well as Silicon-On-Insulator devices. They are produced by irradiating the sample followed by a thermal annealing process. It has been shown that both plasma etching as well as irradiating the sample with either neutrons or electrons may produce the desired radiation centre. Hydrogen may be introduced through water vapour or in its gaseous state, or it may be present within the sample. An excess of hydrogen may, however, fill the dangling bond and render the radiation damage center optically inert. Alternatively, rather than irradiating the sample and treating it with a subsequent thermal annealing process, T centres may be developed using only a thermal treatment in carbon rich CZ grown silicon.

== Optical properties ==
The T centre's zero-phonon line photoluminescence feature is near 935 meV. This represents a transition from an unpaired electron in the ground state to a bound exciton within the first excited state. The 1.8 meV-split doublet is the result of two states within the same defect.

The inhomogeneous linewidth for this feature reduces in isotopically pure silicon-28. Natural silicon contains a mixture of various isotope masses resulting in variations in both the local band gap and binding energies. Without these variations introduced from neighbouring ^{29}Si nuclei, the linewidth reduces from 26.9(8) $\mu$eV to 0.25 $\mu$eV.

== Energy level structure ==
The current accepted model of the T centre proposes an unpaired electron in the ground state and an additional bound exciton in the excited states labeled T and TX respectively. The two electrons in the excited state pair into a spin-0 singlet and the remaining unpaired spin-3/2 hole spin state is split into two Kramers doublets TX_{0} and TX_{1} by the internal stress of the defect. The TX centre is characterized as a pseudo-acceptor with effective mass-like states labeled $N\Gamma$_{K}^{$\pm$} for even and odd parity. $N = 1,2, ...$ represents the principal quantum number and $K$ indicates the symmetry group of the state. The TX ground state is, therefore, an acceptor-like fourfold degenerate $1\Gamma$_{8}^{+} state.

=== Fine structure behavior ===
Both the ground state electron and the first excited state hole are doubly degenerate and split under the Zeeman interaction when exposed to an external magnetic field. Due to the splitting of each state, each orientation subset of the T-centre allows for 4 optical transitions from the ground state to TX_{0}. For the $i^{th}$ subset, the transitions are labeled $\{A,B,C,D\}_i$. Characterization of these transitions is essential for hyperpolarizing the electron into the different transitions for various state manipulation protocols. Further hyperfine spin interactions between the electron and hydrogen are resolved under electron paramagnetic resonance or read using optically detected magnetic resonance signals.

== State manipulation ==
For a centre composed of two ^{12}C constituents subject to an external magnetic field $\mathbf{B}_0$, the spin Hamiltonian for the ground state is given by

$\mathcal{H_T} = \mu_B \mathbf{B}_0\mathbf{g_E}\mathbf{S} + \mu_N g_N \mathbf{B}_0\mathbf{I} +h\mathbf{SAI}$

This Hamiltonian describes the coupling between the unpaired electron and the hydrogen nucleus. The coefficient $\mu_B$ denotes the Bohr magneton. The electron spin vector and g-factor tensor are given by $\mathbf{S}$ and $g_E$. The g-factor tensor is approximately isotropic with $g_E = 2.005(8)$. The hydrogen nuclear spin vector is given by $\mathbf{I}$. $g_N$ represents the hydrogen nuclear spin g-factor, and $\mu_N$ is the nuclear spin magneton. The hyperfine tensor $\mathbf{A}$ is specific to each optically resolvable orientation subset.

=== State preparation ===
Both the electron and nuclear spins can by hyperpolarized using a single optical radio frequency (RF) and a selectively resonant microwave frequency (MF). Continuous-wave electron paramagnetic resonance can be used to depolarize or mix the electron spin state, and the optical transitions $B_i$ and $D_i$ are used for state preparation. Specifically, continuously driving the $B_i$ transition excites the $|\downarrow_E \rangle$ electron into the $|\downarrow_H \rangle$. The state is prepared in the $|\uparrow_E \rangle$ spin-up state following a subsequent decay through the spin-dependent $A_i$ transition. Alternatively, driving the $D_i$ transition hyperpolarizes the population to the spin-down state through the $C_i$ transition.

=== Coherence times ===
The T_{1} lifetimes for both the electron and nuclear spin state have been measured using nuclear magnetic resonance and have been shown to far exceed 16 seconds in ^{28}Si. The averaged electron and nuclear Hahn-echo (T_{2}) times are 2.1(1) ms and 0.28(1)s respectively. (Note: The averaged Hahn-echo times were extracted by fitting the corresponding decay curves to stretched exponentials. The electron coherence time required a stretch factor of 4.1(7) and the nuclear coherence time required a stretch factor of 2.9(4).) A tighter lower bound for the nuclear coherence time was found by averaging the top 10% highest measurements per time, resulting in an average maximum magnitude nuclear coherence time of $T_{2N}^{mm} = 1.1(2)$s.

== See also ==
- Silicon
- Crystallographic defect
