= Berlin-Brandenburg Academy Award =

German science and technology award

The Berlin-Brandenburg Academy Award by the Berlin-Brandenburg Academy of Sciences and Humanities is a annually science prize worth 30,000 euros. It is awarded to a "distinguished scientist whose research achievements have opened new and promising lines of research." The prize is given for outstanding scientific achievements in the fields of humanities and social sciences, mathematics and natural sciences, life sciences and medicine, and engineering sciences. The award ceremony coincides with a Leibniztag plenary lecture in commemoration of Gottfried Leibniz, in which the award winner describes his or her research.

== Award winners ==
- 1996 – Marius Grundmann and Richard Nötzel (experimental physics)
- 1997 – David Vokrouhlický (astronomy and celestial mechanics)
- 1998 – Thomas Kaufmann (theology)
- 1999 – Franz-Ulrich Hartl (biochemistry)
- 2000 – Axel Meyer (evolutionary biology)
- 2001 – Achim von Keudell (plasma physics)
- 2002 – Albrecht Koschorke (literary criticism)
- 2003 – Jürgen Gauß (theoretical chemistry)
- 2004 – Frédéric Merkt (physical chemistry)
- 2005 – Michael Schön (oncology)
- 2006 – Heino Falcke
- 2007 – Martin Haspelmath (linguistics)
- 2008 – Miloš Vec (jurisprudence and legal history)
- 2009 – Matthias Staudacher (theoretical physics)
- 2010 – Michael Kramer (astronomy)
- 2011 – Martin Mulsow
- 2012 – Bernhard Schölkopf
- 2013 – Helmut Cölfen
- 2014 – Andreas Bausch
- 2016 – Peter Scholze
- 2018 – Hannah Monyer
- 2020 – Peter R. Schreiner
