= Marius Grundmann =

German physicist

Marius Grundmann (born 14 November 1964 in Berlin) is a German physicist and university professor. He served as Director of the Felix Bloch Institute for Solid State Physics for two decades.

== Education and career ==
Grundmann attended primary school in Berlin-Schmargendorf from 1970 to 1974. He then attended the Gymnasium zum Grauen Kloster, where he obtained his Abitur (German university entrance qualification) in 1982. In 1983, he began studying physics at the Technical University of Berlin. He graduated in 1988 with a diploma thesis entitled Pseudomorphic Quantum Wells and Excitonic Effects, receiving the overall grade of sehr gut ("very good"). In 1984, he was awarded a scholarship by the German National Academic Foundation (Studienstiftung des deutschen Volkes). From 1988 to 1991, he pursued doctoral studies at the Technical University of Berlin under the supervision of Dieter Bimberg. He completed his doctorate with a dissertation on Heteroepitaxy of InP on Si, graduating summa cum laude. Following research appointments in the United States, Grundmann held a postdoctoral habilitation fellowship funded by the German Research Foundation (DFG) from 1992 to 1994. From 1994 to 2000, he worked as a senior research engineer at the Institute for Solid State Physics of the Technical University of Berlin. He completed his habilitation in 1995 and was granted the venia legendi in 1996.

From 2000 to 2004, Grundmann was funded through the Heisenberg Programme of the German Research Foundation (DFG). In the same year, he was appointed professor at Leipzig University. Since 2002, he has been director of the Institute of Experimental Physics II at Leipzig University. In 2021, he co-founded SAXON Q, a Leipzig-based quantum computing company developing room-temperature quantum computers based on nitrogen-vacancy centers in diamond. From 2022 to 2025, he served as dean of the Faculty of Physics and Earth System Sciences at Leipzig University.

== Selected publications ==
- The Physics of Semiconductors: An Introduction Including Nanophysics and Applications (Graduate Texts in Physics). Springer International Publishing, Cham, 2021. ISBN 978-3-030-51568-3. doi:10.1007/978-3-030-51569-0.
- Marius Grundmann (ed.), Nano-Optoelectronics (NanoScience and Technology). Springer, Berlin and Heidelberg, 2002. ISBN 3-642-62807-9. doi:10.1007/978-3-642-56149-8.

== Honors and awards ==
- 1998 – Gerhard Hess Prize of the German Research Foundation (DFG).
- 1998 – Heinz Maier-Leibnitz Prize, awarded jointly by the German Research Foundation (DFG) and the Federal Ministry of Education and Research (BMBF).
- 2011 – Leipzig Science Prize of the Saxon Academy of Sciences and Humanities.
- 2020 – Rudolf Jaeckel Prize of the German Vacuum Society (DVG).
