= Scanning thermal microscopy =

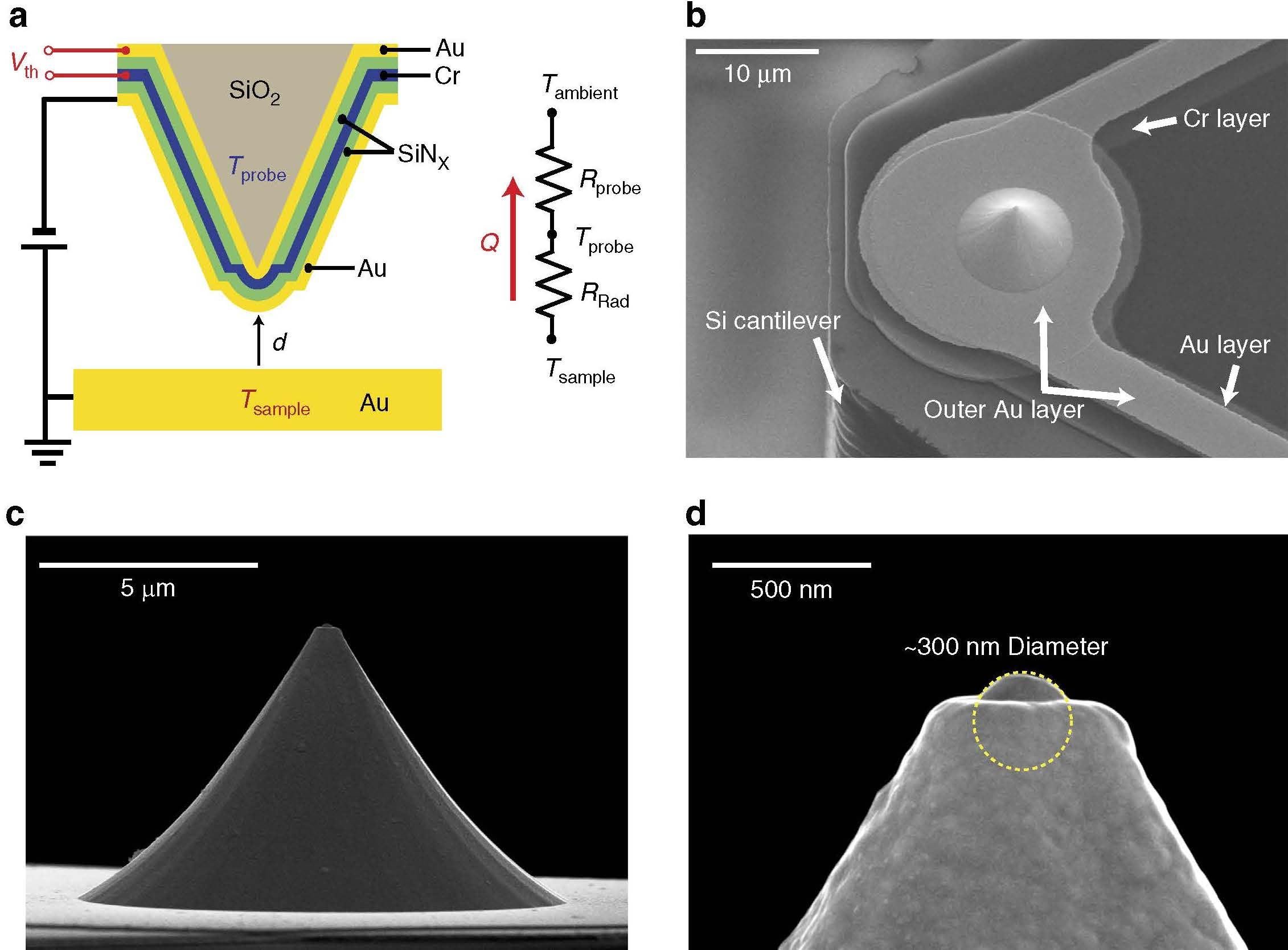
Schematic and SEM images of a conventional SThM tip based on an Au–Cr thermocouple.

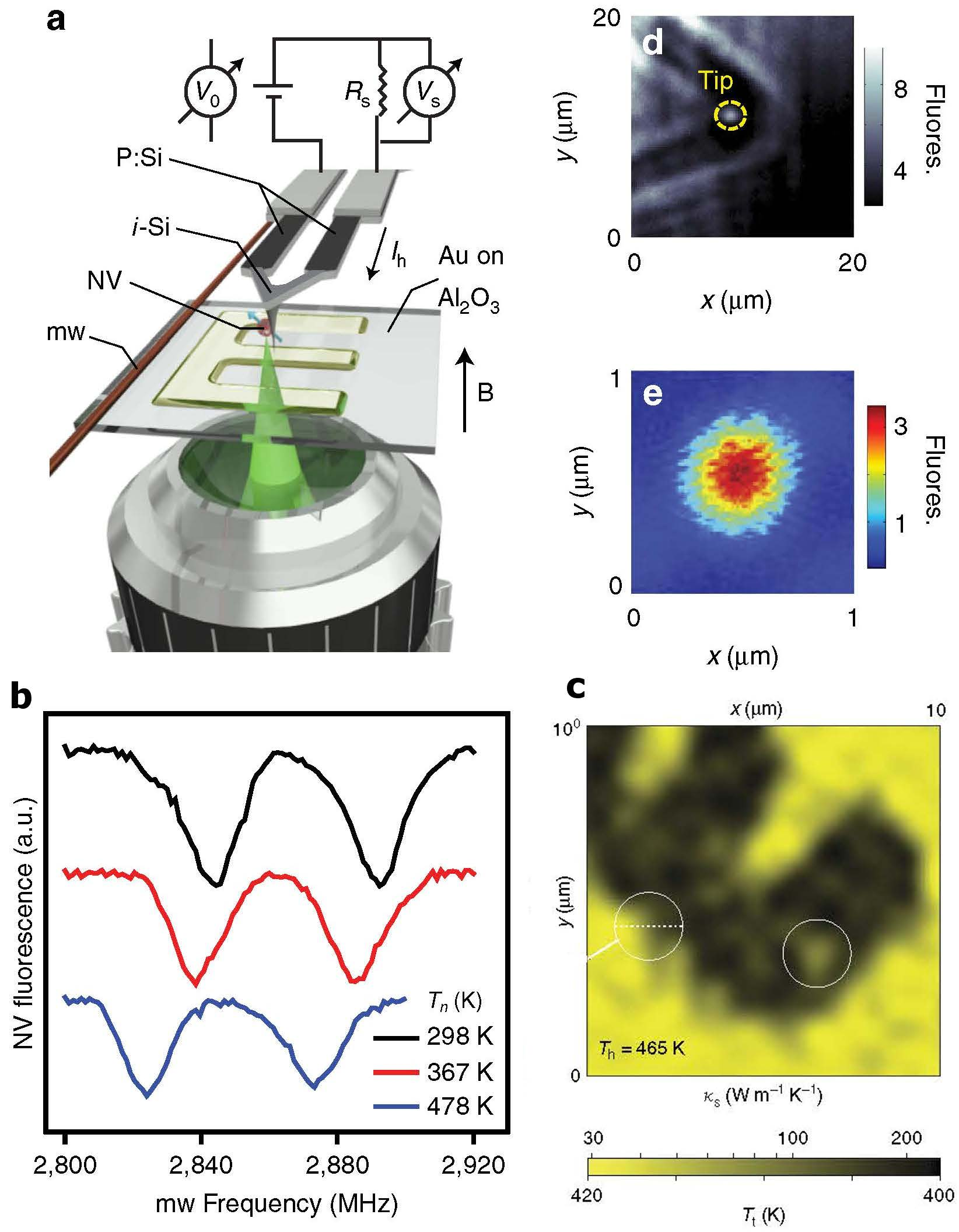
SThM using the N-V center in diamond. (a) Schematics of experimental setup. An electric current is applied to the arms of an AFM cantilever (phosphorus-doped Si, P:Si) and heats up the end section above the tip (intrinsic Si, i-Si). The bottom lens excites a diamond nanocrystal with a green laser light and collects photoluminescence (PL). The crystal hosts an N-V center and is attached to the AFM tip. A wire on the sample surface serves as the microwave source (mw). The temperature of the cantilever T_{h} is determined from the applied current and voltage. (b) Optically detected magnetic resonance spectra of the N-V center at three temperatures. (c) Thermal conductivity image of a gold letter E on sapphire. White circles indicate features that do not correlate with the AFM topography. (d) PL image of the AFM cantilever end and tip where the diamond nanocrystal appears as the bright spot. (e) Zoomed PL image of the N-V center in d.

Scanning thermal microscopy (SThM) is a type of scanning probe microscopy that maps the local temperature and thermal conductivity of an interface. The probe in a scanning thermal microscope is sensitive to local temperatures – providing a nano-scale thermometer. Thermal measurements at the nanometer scale are of both scientific and industrial interest. The technique was invented by Clayton C. Williams and H. Kumar Wickramasinghe in 1986.

== Applications ==
SThM allows thermal measurements at the nano-scale. These measurements can include: temperature, thermal properties of materials, thermal conductivity, heat capacity, glass transition temperature, latent heat, enthalpy, etc. The applications include:

- Ultra large-scale integration (ULSI) lithography research and cellular diagnostics in biochemistry.
- Detecting such parameters as phase changes in polymer blends.
- Joule heating
- Measuring material variations in semiconductor devices
- Subsurface imaging
- Near-field photo thermal micro-spectroscopy
- Calorimetry applications
- Hot-spots in integrated circuits
- Low temperature scanning thermal microscopy
- Magnetic spectroscopy in combination with the ferromagnetic resonance realized in the SThM-FMR technique
- Other applications

== Technique ==
SThM requires the use of specialized probes. There are two types of thermal probes: Thermocouple probes where the probe temperature is monitored by a thermocouple junction at the probe tip and resistive or bolometer probes where the probe temperature is monitored by a thin-film resistor at probe tip. These probes are generally made from thin dielectric films on a silicon substrate and use a metal or semiconductor film bolometer to sense the tip temperature. Other approaches, using more involved micro machining methods, have also been reported. In a bolometer probe the resistor is used as a local heater and the fractional change in probe resistance is used to detect the temperature and/or the thermal conductance of the sample. When the tip is placed in contact with the sample, heat flows from the tip to sample. As the probe is scanned, the amount of heat flow changes. By monitoring the heat flow, one can create a thermal map of the sample, revealing spatial variations in thermal conductivity in a sample. Through a calibration process, the SThM can reveal the quantitative values of thermal conductivity. Alternately the sample may be actively heated, for example a powered circuit, to visualize the distribution of temperatures on the sample.

Tip-sample heat transfer can include

- Solid-solid conduction. Probe tip to sample. This is the transfer mechanism which yields the thermal scan.
- Liquid-liquid conduction. When scanning in non-zero humidity, a liquid meniscus forms between the tip and sample. Conduction can occur through this liquid drop.
- Gas conduction. Heat can be transferred through the edges of the probe tip to the sample.
