= Matthias Staudacher =

German theoretical physicist

Matthias Staudacher (born 13 September 1963) is a German theoretical physicist who has done significant work in the area of quantum field theory and string theory.

== Education ==
Beginning his physics studies at Heidelberg University and at LMU Munich, Staudacher then earned a Ph.D. at the University of Illinois at Urbana-Champaign (1990) with a dissertation on matrix models of two-dimensional quantum gravity.

== Career ==
After postdoctoral work at Rutgers University in New Jersey, Paris and CERN in Geneva, from 1997 he was a researcher at the Max Planck Institute for Gravitational Physics (Albert Einstein Institute) in Potsdam. In 2009, he received the Academy Award of the Berlin-Brandenburg Academy of Sciences and Humanities and became a mathematical physics professor at Humboldt University of Berlin in 2010. Some of his publications have been instrumental in developing an understanding of the so-called AdS/CFT correspondence, a duality between the Yang-Mills-type quantum theory and supersymmetric string theory first suggested in the 1990s by Juan Martín Maldacena. Staudacher suggests that the integrable spin chains of condensed matter physics may form the link between the two approaches.

His doctoral students include Niklas Beisert.

== Selected publications ==
- 1997 – V. A. Kazakov and M. Staudacher, "Advances in Large N Group Theory and the Solution of Two-Dimensional R² Gravity", pp. 265–277 in Low-dimensional applications of Quantum field theory, Laurent Baulieu, Vladimir Kazakov, Marco Picco, Paul Windey (Eds.) Plenum Press, New York. ISBN 0-306-45686-9
- Beisert, Niklas; Eden, Burkhard; Staudacher, Matthias (2007-01-30). "Transcendentality and crossing". Journal of Statistical Mechanics: Theory and Experiment. 2007 (1) P01021. IOP Publishing. arXiv:hep-th/0610251. Bibcode:2007JSMTE..01...21B. doi:10.1088/1742-5468/2007/01/p01021. ISSN 1742-5468. S2CID 15227034.

== See also ==
- Benna, M. K.; Benvenuti, S.; Klebanov, I. R.; Scardicchio, A. (2007-03-30). "Test of the Anti–de Sitter-Space/Conformal-Field-Theory Correspondence Using High-Spin Operators". Physical Review Letters. 98 (13) 131603. arXiv:hep-th/0611135. Bibcode:2007PhRvL..98m1603B. doi:10.1103/physrevlett.98.131603. ISSN 0031-9007. PMID 17501185.
- Interview in journal HU-WISSEN Edition 6, December 2013 jointly with Jan Plefka.
- Matthias Staudacher at Humboldt University
