= Niklas Beisert =

German physicist (born 1977)

Niklas Beisert (born 1977 in Hamburg) is a German theoretical physicist, known for his research on quantum field theory and string theory.

== Biography ==
Niklas Beisert is the son of the architect and art historian Anna Katharina Beisert-Zülch (of the University of Hildesheim) and the architect Thomas Beisert (of the company APB Planungsgesellschaft mbH Architekten). Anna Katharina Beisert-Zülch's father was the neuroscientist Klaus-Joachim Zülch (1910–1988). Niklas Beisert studied physics, as a scholarship holder of the Studienstiftung des Deutschen Volkes (German Academic Scholarship Foundation), at the Technical University of Munich from 1996 to 2001, when he received his Diplom. For the academic year 1999–2000 he attended an M.Sc. course at Imperial College London. After receiving his Diplom he was a researcher the Max Planck Institute for Gravitational Physics in Golm-Potsdam. In 2004 he received his doctorate from the Humboldt University of Berlin. His doctoral dissertation The Dilation Operator of N=4 Super-Yang-Mills Theory and Integrability was supervised by Matthias Staudacher. As a post-doctoral fellow, Beisert was at Princeton University (as a Dicke Fellow), where he became an assistant professor in 2005. From 2006 to 2011 he was group leader of the theory group Dualität und Integrable Strukturen (Duality and Integrable Structures) at the Max Planck Institute for Gravitational Physics in Golm-Potsdam. Since 2011 is a full professor at ETH Zurich. He is married and the father of three children.

== Research ==
Beisert does research on integrable structures (i.e., structures that allow exact solvability) and symmetries in (four-dimensional) gauge field theory and string theory related to the AdS/CFT correspondence. The AdS/CFT correspondence expresses an equivalence in the description of gauge theories (as used in the Standard Model of elementary particle physics) and string theories, but has not yet been proven or disproven. By applying techniques that have been used for exactly integrable systems in solid-state physics (such as one-dimensional spin chains and the Bethe ansatz), Beisert, Staudacher, and colleagues made progress in gauge/string duality for the case of supersymmetric gauge field theories with maximal symmetry (planar N=4 supersymmetric Yang-Mills theory, with symmetry group 𝖕𝖘𝖚(2,2|4)). This research effort was pioneered by the University of Uppsala's Joseph Minahan and Konstantin Zarembo, who previously found evidence of integrable structures. The resulting research developments in the solution of supersymmetric gauge field theories for large N was described by David Gross, at the Strings-07 conference in Madrid, as the most interesting development in string theory in the preceding year.

== Awards and honors ==
He received in 2005 the Otto Hahn Medal of the Max Planck Society and in 2007 the Gribov Medal of the European Physical Society. In 2006 he was awarded a two-year Sloan Research Fellowship. In 2013 he received the New Horizons in Physics Prize.

== Selected publications ==
- Beisert, N.; Kristjansen, C.; Staudacher, M. (2003). "The dilatation operator of conformal super-Yang–Mills theory". Nuclear Physics B. 664 (1–2): 131–184. arXiv:hep-th/0303060. doi:10.1016/S0550-3213(03)00406-1.
- Beisert, Niklas (2004). "The dilatation operator of N=4 super Yang–Mills theory and integrability". Physics Reports. 405 (1–3): 1–202. arXiv:hep-th/0407277. Bibcode:2004PhR...405....1B. doi:10.1016/j.physrep.2004.09.007.
- Beisert, N.; Kazakov, V.A.; Sakai, K.; Zarembo, K. (2006). "The Algebraic Curve of Classical Superstrings on AdS_{5} × S^{5} ". Communications in Mathematical Physics. 263 (3): 659–710. arXiv:hep-th/0502226. Bibcode:2006CMaPh.263..659B. doi:10.1007/s00220-006-1529-4.
- Beisert, Niklas; Ricci, Riccardo; Tseytlin, Arkady A.; Wolf, Martin (2008). "Dual superconformal symmetry from AdS_{5} × S^{5} superstring integrability". Physical Review D. 78 (12) 126004. arXiv:0807.3228. Bibcode:2008PhRvD..78l6004B. doi:10.1103/PhysRevD.78.126004.
- Beisert, Niklas; Ahn, Changrim; Alday, Luis F.; Bajnok, Zoltán; Drummond, James M.; Freyhult, Lisa; Gromov, Nikolay; Janik, Romuald A.; Kazakov, Vladimir; Klose, Thomas; Korchemsky, Gregory P.; Kristjansen, Charlotte; Magro, Marc; McLoughlin, Tristan; Minahan, Joseph A.; Nepomechie, Rafael I.; Rej, Adam; Roiban, Radu; Schäfer-Nameki, Sakura; Sieg, Christoph; Staudacher, Matthias; Torrielli, Alessandro; Tseytlin, Arkady A.; Vieira, Pedro; Volin, Dmytro; Zoubos, Konstantinos (2012). "Review of AdS/CFT Integrability: An Overview". Letters in Mathematical Physics. 99 (1–3): 3–32. arXiv:1012.3982. Bibcode:2012LMaPh..99....3B. doi:10.1007/s11005-011-0529-2.
