= Germanium-vacancy center in diamond =

Optically active defect in diamonds

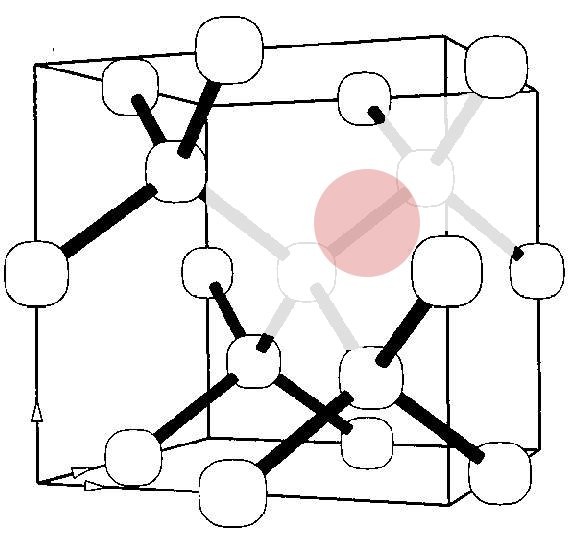
The semi-divacancy model of the Ge-V center, which is also common for other large impurities in diamond.

Ge-V luminescence spectra measured at different temperatures.

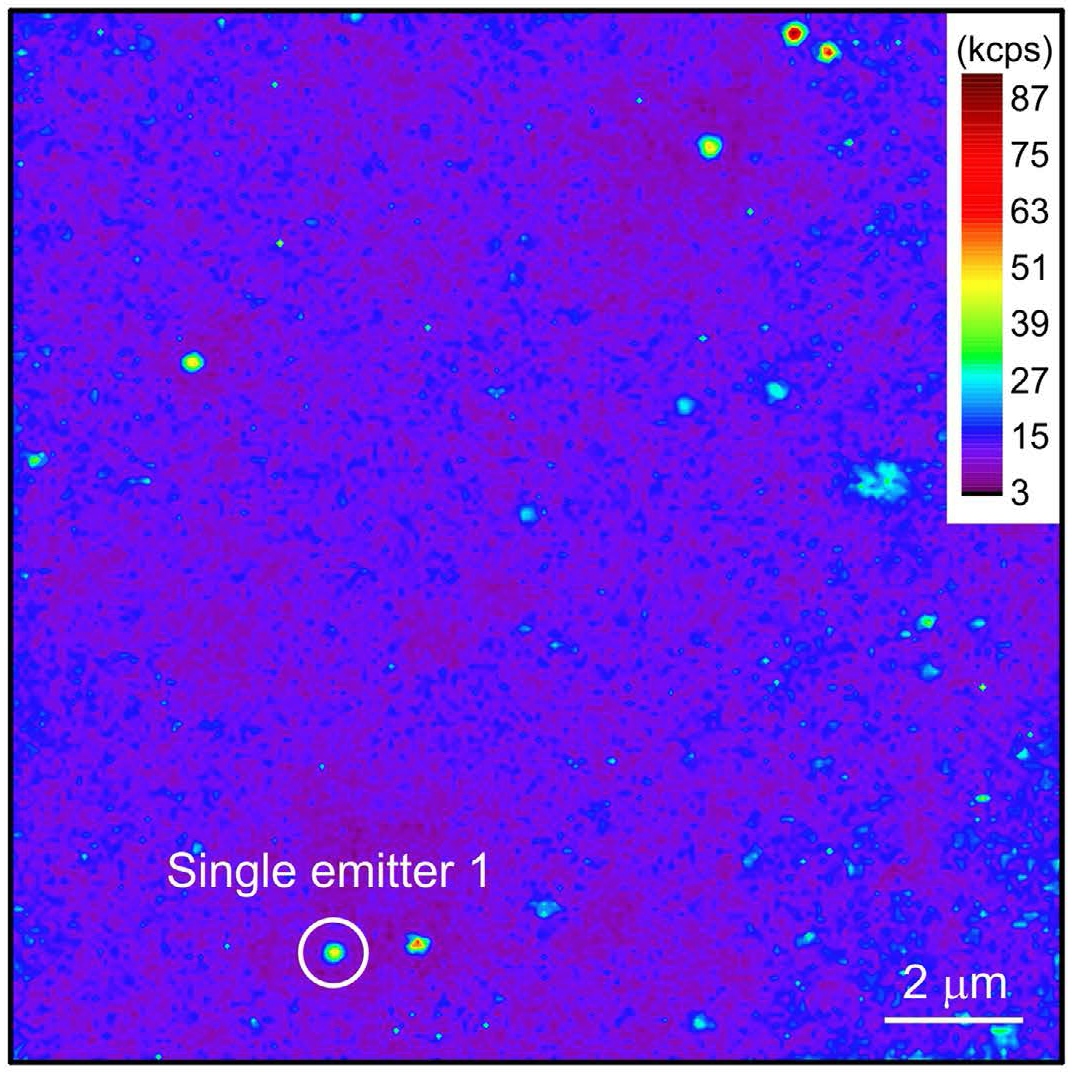
Spatial map of Ge-V centers in diamond produced by ion implantation.

The germanium-vacancy center (Ge-V) is an optically active defect in diamond, which can be created by doping germanium into diamond during its growth or by implanting germanium ions into diamond after its growth. Its properties are similar to those of the silicon-vacancy center in diamond (SiV). Ge-V can behave as a single-photon source and shows potential for quantum and nanoscience applications due to its narrow zero-phonon line (ZPL) and minimal phononic-sideband (compared to that of the nitrogen-vacancy center (NV)).

== Properties ==
Ge-V is predicted to consist of one germanium atom situated between two adjacent lattice vacancies and have the same D_{3d} point group symmetry as SiV. It has a single ZPL at 602 nm (2.059 eV) at room-temperature, which splits into two components separated by 0.67 meV at low-temperatures (10 K). The Ge-V has an excited state lifetime of 1.4–5.5 ns.

== Formation ==
Ge-V can be created during the diamond growth, or by ion implantation and subsequent annealing at 800 °C. The former way results in lower lattice strain, as revealed by the spread in the position and width of the Ge-V ZPL.

== See also ==
- Crystallographic defects in diamond
- Material properties of diamond
- Nitrogen-vacancy center
- Silicon-vacancy center in diamond
