= Silicon-vacancy center in diamond =

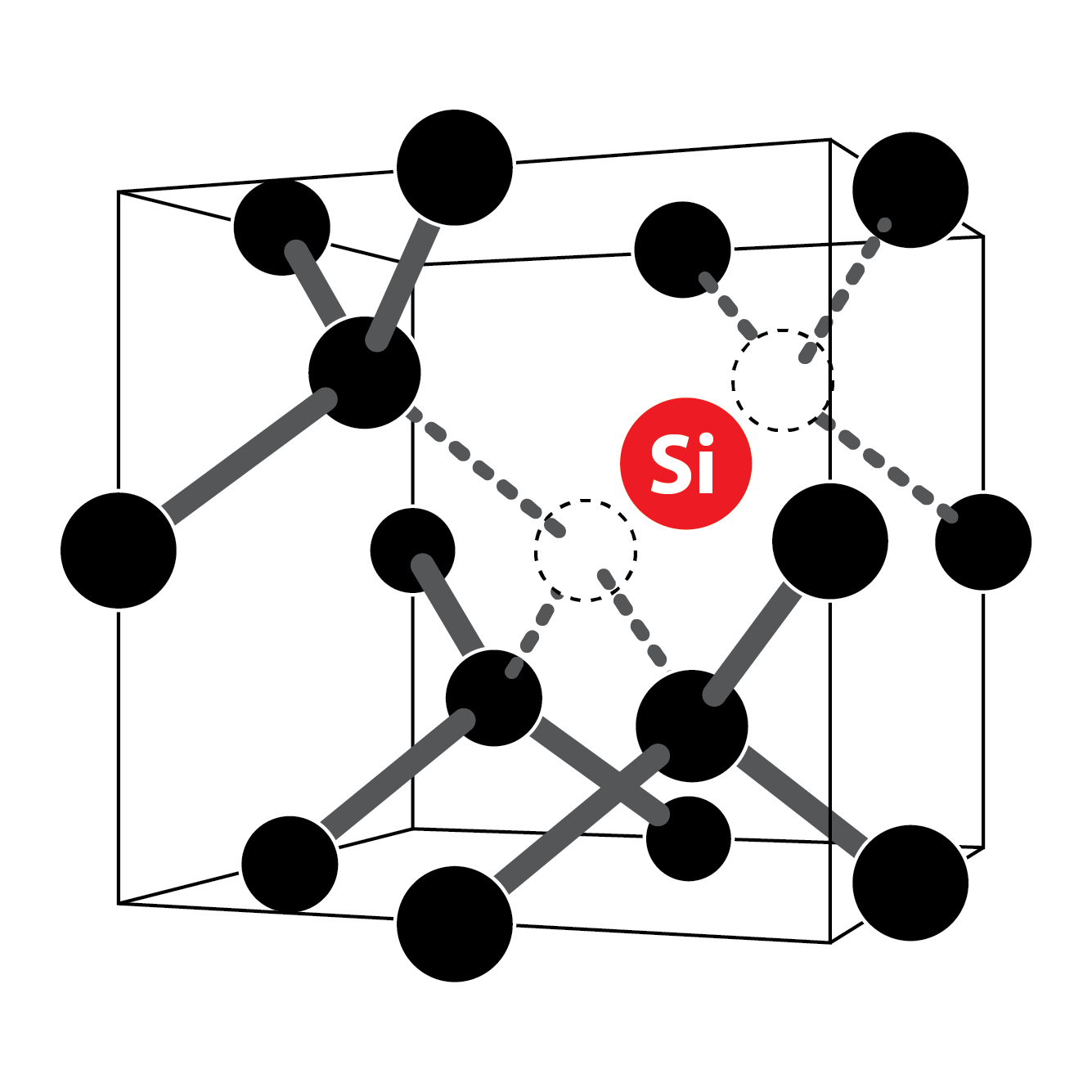
The semi-divacancy model of the Si-V center, which is the same as for other group IV vacancy centers in diamond.

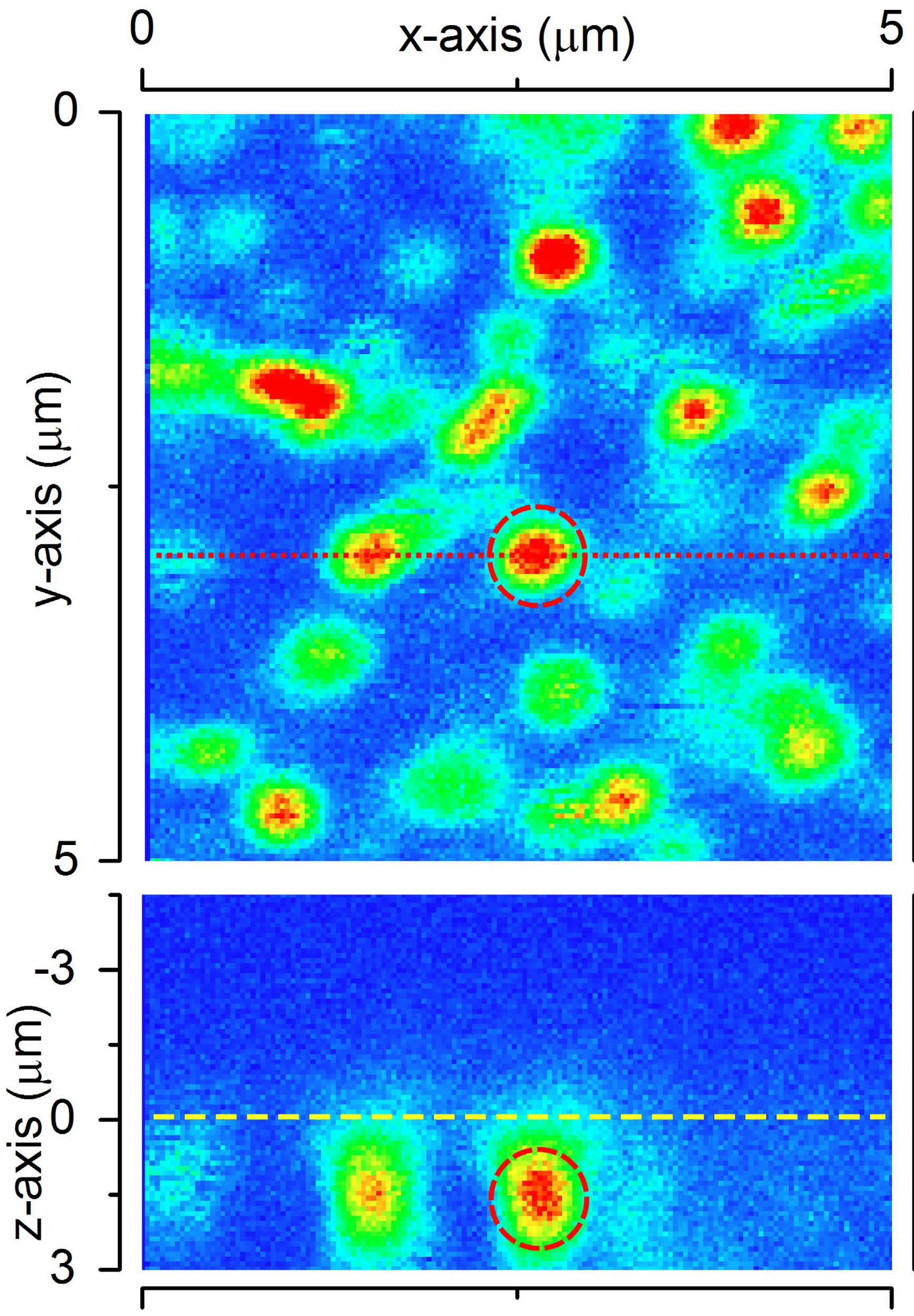
Luminescence maps of the Si-V center in diamond produced by ion implantation: x-y (top) and x-z (bottom). The x-z depth map was measured along the black line in the top image.

The silicon-vacancy center (Si-V) is an optically active defect in diamond (referred to as a color center) that is receiving an increasing amount of interest in the diamond research community. This interest is driven primarily by the coherent optical properties of the Si-V, especially compared to the well-known and extensively-studied nitrogen-vacancy center (N-V). While the negative Si-V^{−} center has received the majority of the silicon-vacancy center research, interest is growing in the neutral Si-V^{0} center as well.

== History ==
Early observations of optical features later associated with the silicon-vacancy (Si-V) centre were made in the context of chemical vapour deposition (CVD) diamond growth. Collins et al. reported previously unseen absorption and emission lines in CVD diamond films, including a photoluminescence feature at ~1.681 eV, and studied its response to electron irradiation and annealing.

A similar line at ~1.684 eV was earlier observed using cathodoluminescence spectroscopy by Vavilov et al. in CVD diamond, and was later linked to silicon incorporation when Zaitsev et al. detected the feature only in samples implanted with silicon ions. Their work suggested a quadratic dependence of cathodoluminescence intensity on implantation dose, although the defect structure remained uncertain at the time.

Robins et al. observed a related transition at 1.675 eV (cathodoluminescence) / 1.681 eV (photoluminescence) in CVD diamond films with poor growth morphology, and suggested association with the neutral vacancy (GR1) centre due to a small uniaxial stress response.

Further work by Clark and Dickerson confirmed the link between the defect and silicon through ion-implantation studies, and showed that annealing above ~600 °C enhanced the 1.681 eV emission following irradiation, indicating that vacancy mobility plays a role in defect formation. Their results supported a model in which the centre consists of a substitutional silicon atom adjacent to a lattice vacancy — a configuration consistent with later structural determination of the Si-V centre.

These early studies laid the foundation for later detailed characterization of the split-vacancy structure and optical properties that define the Si-V centre today.

== Properties ==
=== Crystallographic ===
The Si-V center is formed by replacing two neighboring carbon atoms in the diamond lattice with one silicon atom, which places itself between the two vacant lattice sites. This configuration has a D_{3d} point group symmetry.

=== Electronic ===
The Si-V^{−} center is a single-hole (spin-1/2) system with ground and excited electronic states located within the diamond bandgap. The ground and excited electronic states have two orbital states split by spin–orbit coupling. Each of these spin–orbit states is doubly degenerate by spin, and this splitting can be affected by lattice strain. Phonons in the diamond lattice drive transitions between these orbital states, causing rapid equilibration of the orbital population at temperatures above ca. 1 K.

All four transitions between the two ground and two excited orbital states are dipole allowed with a sharp zero-phonon line (ZPL) at 738 nm (1.68 eV) and minimal phononic sideband in a roughly 20 nm window around 766 nm. The Si-V center emits much more of its emission into its ZPL, approximately 70% (Debye–Waller factor of 0.7), than most other optical centers in diamond, such as the nitrogen-vacancy center (Debye–Waller factor ~ 0.04). The Si-V^{−} center also has higher excited states that relax quickly to the lowest excited states, allowing off-resonant excitation.

The Si-V center has an inversion symmetry, and no static electric dipole moment (to the first order); it is therefore insensitive to the Stark shift that could result from inhomogeneous electric fields within the diamond lattice. This property, together with the weak electron-phonon coupling, results in a narrow ZPL in the Si-V center, which is mostly limited by its intrinsic lifetime. Bright photoluminescence, narrow optical lines, and ease of finding optically indistinguishable Si-V centers favor them for applications in solid-state quantum optics.

The Si-V^{0} center has one fewer electron than the Si-V^{−}, giving it a neutral charge and different properties. The Si-V^{0} center is a spin-1 system with a spin coherence superior to the Si-V^{−} center. At room temperature, its ZPL lies in the infrared spectrum at 946 nm with an excellent Debye-Waller factor of 0.9,. However, stabilizing Si-V^{0} is more of a challenge compared to Si-V^{-}, with high precision (1-3 ppm) needed in controlling its boron concentration.

=== Spin ===
Although the optical transitions of the Si-V^{−} center preserve the electron spin, the rapid phonon-induced mixing between the Si-V^{−} orbital states causes spin decoherence. At very low temperatures below 100 millikelvin, spin coherence for the Si-V^{−} center improves significantly. The Si-V^{0} spin coherence properties remain favourable at higher temperatures up to 20 kelvin. It is possible to use the ^{29}Si nuclear spin and the electron spin of the Si-V as qubits for quantum information applications.

=== Comparison to Nitrogen-Vacancy Center (N-V) ===
The N-V center is a similar defect in diamond with more historical significance. Research on the N-V center dates to the 1950s, but the negative Si-V^{−} center was discovered in 1980 and the neutral Si-V^{0} center was first seen in 2011. The two defects have different advantages and drawbacks. At room temperature, the N-V center has much better spin coherence, a wider ZPL, and wider phonon sideband. The sharpness of the Si-V center's ZPL, its large Debye–Waller factor, as well as its ability to remain stable in nanophotonic structures are the main properties that have drawn research to it instead of using the more studied N-V center.

== Synthesis ==
=== Ion Implantation ===
Ion implantation has been used to synthesize Si-V centers in nanodiamonds. Si ions are implanted into the NDs at specific depths and implantation energies before being annealed. After the ion implantation, additional thermal treatments may be applied to repair structural defects and activate impurities. Unlike the ion implantation used to produce N-V centers, Si-V complexes can withstand higher temperature thermal treatments without dissociation risk. In practice, Si-V centers have been synthesized using multiple systems, with differing optical properties such as the widths of resultant ZPLs.

=== Chemical Vapor Deposition ===
Chemical vapor deposition (CVD) is used to synthesize Si-V centers via a similar process to that used to produce N-V centers. In the case of Si-V centers, there are two main types of CVD used. First, when a solid containing silicon is etched with hydrogen, and SiH_{x} radicals dope the diamond lattice. Second, a silicon containing plasma is created containing SiH_{3} which functions as the dopant. Si-V centers have been synthesized via tetramethylsilane (TMS) gas as a doping source, and in the hydrogen plasma example chemical combinations such as H_{2}, CH_{4}, and CO_{2}; and H_{2}, CH_{4}, and N_{2}, have been used to grow the diamonds on Si substrates.

== Applications ==
Si-V centers' special properties make them preferred to N-V centers in some specific applications. Si-V centers can be used in temperature sensing, photoelectric detectors, and biochemical visualization amongst others.

=== Nanoscale Thermometer ===
Because Si-V centers have such a sharp ZPL, they are used in temperature probes that measure the change in ZPL peaks. These temperature probes have achieved sub-Kelvin precision in less than a second, and do not need individual calibration. Due to the non-invasive nature of these luminescent thermometers, they lend themselves well to biological applications. For example, Si-V nano-scale thermometers have been used for thermosensing within live cells.

=== Photoelectric Detectors ===
Though there is little research favoring Si-V centers over N-V centers in photoelectric detectors, Si-V centers still exhibit a greater response and faster cutoff time compared to undoped detectors. This technology is expected to have applications in many fields including quantum information processing and bio-marking.

=== Biochemical Visualization ===
Confocal microscopes utilizing Si-V centers have been used to visualize cells in a non-invasive way. Additionally, nano diamond vacancy centers like Si-V centers can detect chemical reactions within cells and function as long-term biological markers.

=== Quantum Information ===
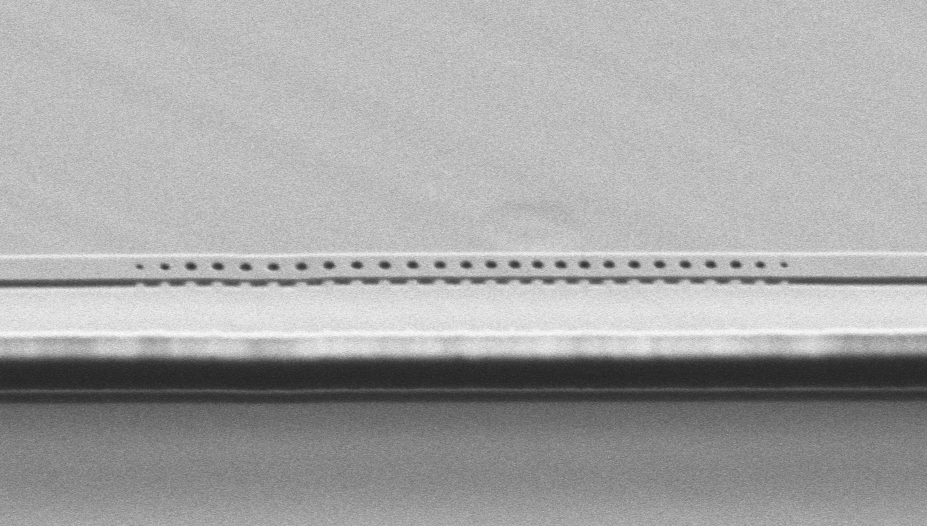
SEM image of a diamond nanophotonic optical cavity on a diamond chip in which Si-V^{−} centers have been integrated.

Si-V^{−} centers in dilution refrigeration systems below 100 millikelvin can be used in quantum network applications, with spin memory long enough for entanglement up to 500 kilometers. This is because Si-V^{−} centers can be integrated in nanophotonic structures to improve their interaction with photons for quantum communication. Nuclear spins, such as the ^{29}Si nuclear spin of the center itself or ^{13}C nuclear spins naturally present in the diamond around the Si-V can also be used as nuclear memory qubits. Research interest in the neutral Si-V^{0} center is also growing, since it has better spin coherence than the negative Si-V^{−} center at higher temperature with a spin coherence time of 1 second, giving it potential as a material to be used in quantum networks.

== See also ==
- Crystallographic defect
- Germanium-vacancy center in diamond
- Material properties of diamond
- Nitrogen-vacancy center
