= Optically detected magnetic resonance =

Technique for detecting quantum objects

In physics, optically detected magnetic resonance (ODMR) is a technique for detecting quantum systems with spin-dependent optical transitions. In the case of fluorescent point defects (color centers) in crystals, the "ODMR signal" refers to a change in the defect's fluorescence intensity due to a simultaneously applied AC magnetic field. When the magnetic field frequency is resonant with a spin transition, which means that the frequency matches the energy splitting between two spin states, the spin system undergoes Rabi oscillations between the two states. If the two spin states have different fluorescence intensities, this results in a change in the defect's fluorescence. This can be used to measure properties of the spin such as the zero-field splitting and the gyromagnetic ratio. There may be many spin transitions, and their characteristics as observed with ODMR (principally frequency and linewidth) depend sensitively on the conditions of the measurement, motivating the use of ODMR as a technique for quantum sensing.

Like electron paramagnetic resonance (EPR), ODMR makes use of the Zeeman effect in unpaired electrons. The negatively charged nitrogen vacancy centre (NV^{−}) has been the target of considerable interest with regards to performing experiments using ODMR.

ODMR of NV^{−}s in diamond has applications in magnetometry and sensing, biomedical imaging, quantum information and the exploration of fundamental physics.

== NV ODMR ==
The nitrogen vacancy defect in diamond consists of a single substitutional nitrogen atom (replacing one carbon atom) and an adjacent gap, or vacancy, in the lattice where normally a carbon atom would be located.

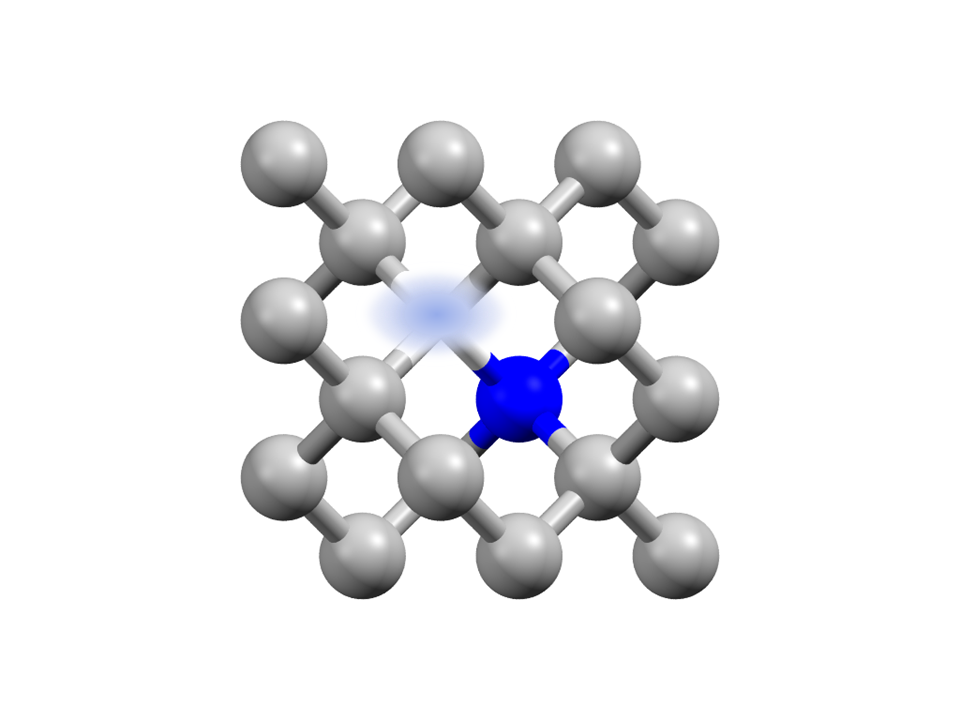
A nitrogen vacancy centre in the diamond lattice, viewed along the [100] axis. Carbon atoms (grey) make up the bulk diamond crystal. A substitutional nitrogen atom (blue sphere) sits next to a vacancy (shaded region), forming the NV.

The nitrogen vacancy occurs in three possible charge states: positive (NV^{+}), neutral (NV^{0}) and negative (NV^{−}). As NV^{−} is the only one of these charge states which has shown to be simply ODMR active, it is often referred to simply as the NV. Recently, there have been ongoing efforts to also use the neutral species NV^{0}. This has the advantage of being spatially isotropic and thus not needing to consider alignment.

The energy level structure of the NV^{−} consists of a triplet ground state, a triplet excited state and two singlet states. Under resonant optical excitation, the NV may be raised from the triplet ground state to the triplet excited state. The centre may then return to the ground state via two routes; by the emission of a photon of 637 nm in the zero phonon line (ZPL) (or longer wavelength from the phonon sideband) or alternatively via the aforementioned singlet states through intersystem crossing and the emission of a 1042 nm photon. A return to the ground state via the latter route will preferentially result in the $m_s = 0$ state.

Relaxation to the $m_s = 0$ state necessarily results in a decrease in visible wavelength fluorescence (as the emitted photon is in the infrared range). Microwave pumping at a resonant frequency of $\nu = 2.87\text{ }GHz$ places the centre in the degenerate $m_s = \pm 1$ state. The application of a magnetic field lifts this degeneracy, causing Zeeman splitting and the decrease of fluorescence at two resonant frequencies, given by $h\nu = g_e\mu_{B} B_0$, where $h$ is the Planck constant, $g_e$ is the electron g-factor and $\mu_B$ is the Bohr magneton. Sweeping the microwave field through these frequencies results in two characteristic dips in the observed fluorescence, the separation between which enables determination of the strength of the magnetic field $B_0$.

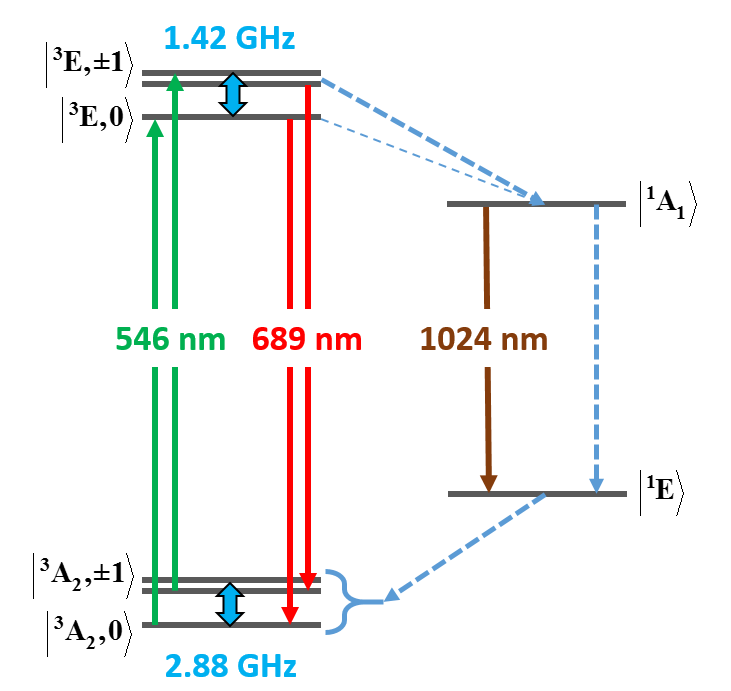
Excitation with green light places the NV in the triplet excited state. Relaxation then emits either a red or (undetected) infrared photon, placing the centre in the $m_s = 0$ state. Microwave pumping raises the centre to $m_s = \pm 1$, where Zeeman splitting can occur.

=== Hyperfine splitting ===
Further splitting in the fluorescence spectrum may occur due to the hyperfine interaction, which leads to further resonance conditions and corresponding spectral lines. In NV ODMR, this detailed structure usually originates from nitrogen and carbon-13 atoms near to the defect. These atoms have small magnetic fields which interact with the spectral lines from the NV, causing further splitting.

Hyperfine interactions in nitrogen-vacancy (NV) centres arise from nearby nuclear spins, primarily due to nitrogen (14N or 15N) and, in some cases 13C atoms near the defect. These interactions are significant because they further split the energy levels of the NV center, resulting in additional resonances in the ODMR spectrum. The nitrogen atom in the NV centre can exist as either 14N (with nuclear spin I = 1) or 15N (with nuclear spin I=1/2). The most common isotope, 14N, couples with the electron spin of the NV center, leading to a hyperfine splitting of the states $m_s = \pm 1$ into three sub-levels.

  
  
    
      
        
          H
          
            S
            I
          
        
        =
        
          A
          
            ∥
          
        
        
          S
          
            Z
          
        
        
          I
          
            Z
          
        
        +
        
          A
          
            ⊥
          
        
        (
        
          S
          
            X
          
        
        
          I
          
            X
          
        
        +
        
          S
          
            Y
          
        
        
          I
          
            Y
          
        
        )
        ,
      
    
    {\displaystyle H_{SI}=A_{\parallel }S_{Z}I_{Z}+A_{\perp }(S_{X}I_{X}+S_{Y}I_{Y}),}
  

The interaction of NV electron spin with 14N nuclear spin can be defined by the hamiltonian shown above where S represents NV electron spin system and I represents nitrogen nuclear spin. This splitting typically depends upon the constants $A_{\parallel}=2.14$ MHz and $A_{\perp}=2.14$ MHz. Splitting can be observed as three peaks in the ODMR hyperfine resolved spectrum. In NV centres, hyperfine splitting arises due to the interaction between the NV electron spin magnetic spin moment and nuclear spin magnetic moments. NV spin magnetic moments also depend upon the external magnetic field magnitude and orientation. To perform hyperfine resolved ODMR, a single NV ODMR experiment is generally preferable. If 15N is present instead of 14N. It will split $m_s = \pm 1$ into two sublevels.

Nearby 13C atoms (with nuclear spin I=1/2) can also interact with the NV centre (3). 13C carbon atoms are randomly distributed in diamonds and have a natural abundance of about 1.1%. When located near the NV center, they induce additional fine structures in the ODMR signal. The coupling strength varies with the position of the 13C nuclei relative to the NV center.

== Bibliography ==
- Wang, J. F.; Liu, L.; Liu, X. D.; Li, Q.; Cui, J. M.; Zhou, D. F.; Zhou, J. Y.; Wei, Y.; Xu, H. A.; Xu, W.; Lin, W. X.; Yan, J. W.; He, Z. X.; Liu, Z. H.; Hao, Z. H.; Li, H. O.; Liu, W.; Xu, J. S.; Gregoryanz, E.; Li, C. F.; Guo, G. C. (23 March 2023). "Chinese Breakthrough in High-Pressure Superconducting Magnetic Detection". Nature Materials. 22 (4). SciTech Daily: 489–494. doi:10.1038/s41563-023-01477-5. PMID 36959503. S2CID 247045144.
