= Nitrogen-vacancy center =

Point defect in diamonds

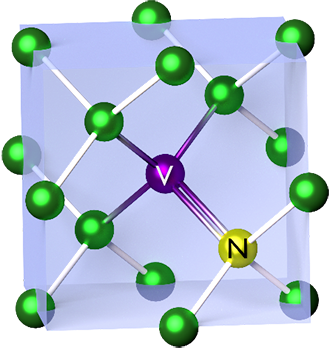
- Simplified atomic structure of the NV center

Quantum Physics & Material Science
- Symbol: NV center
- Host material: Diamond (carbon lattice)
- Type: Point defect
- Symmetry: C_{3v}
- Applications: Quantum computing; Quantum sensing (magnetometry); Nanoscale NMR; Bioimaging
- Key properties: Long spin coherence; Room-temperature operation; Photoluminescence
- Charge states: NV^{0} (neutral); NV^{−} (negative)
- Spin state (NV^{−}): Spin triplet (S=1)
- Zero-field splitting: ~2.87 GHz

The nitrogen-vacancy center (N-V center or NV center) is one of numerous photoluminescent point defects in diamond. It consists of a nearest-neighbor pair of a nitrogen atom, which substitutes for a carbon atom, and a lattice vacancy.

The most explored and useful properties of an NV center include its spin-dependent photoluminescence (which enables measurement of the electronic spin state using optically detected magnetic resonance), and its relatively long spin coherence at room temperature, lasting up to milliseconds. The NV center energy levels are modified by magnetic fields, electric fields, temperature, and strain, which allow it to serve as a sensor of a variety of physical phenomena. Its atomic size and spin properties can form the basis for useful quantum sensors.

NV centers enable nanoscale measurements of magnetic and electric fields, temperature, and mechanical strain with improved precision. Beyond sensing, NV centers have been investigated as room-temperature polarization sources for nuclear spins in diamond. Optically induced cross relaxation between NV centers and substitutional nitrogen defects (P1 centers) in the ground state has been identified as the dominant mechanism for bulk ^{13}C hyperpolarization, enabling significant enhancement of nuclear magnetic resonance signals without requiring microwave excitation or cryogenic conditions. External perturbation sensitivity makes NV centers ideal for applications in biomedicine—such as single-molecule imaging and cellular process modeling. NV centers can also be initialized as qubits and enable the implementation of quantum algorithms and networks. It has also been explored for applications in quantum computing (e.g. for entanglement generation), quantum simulation, and spintronics.

== Production ==
Natural NV centers are randomly oriented within a diamond crystal. Ion implantation techniques can enable their artificial creation in predetermined positions, as follows.

Nitrogen-vacancy centers are typically produced from single substitutional nitrogen centers (called C or P1 centers in diamond literature) by irradiation followed by annealing at temperatures above 700 °C. A wide range of high-energy particles is suitable for such irradiation, including electrons, protons, neutrons, ions, and gamma photons. Irradiation produces lattice vacancies, which are a part of NV centers. Those vacancies are immobile at room temperature, and annealing is required to move them. Single substitutional nitrogen produces strain in the diamond lattice; it therefore efficiently captures moving vacancies, producing the NV centers.

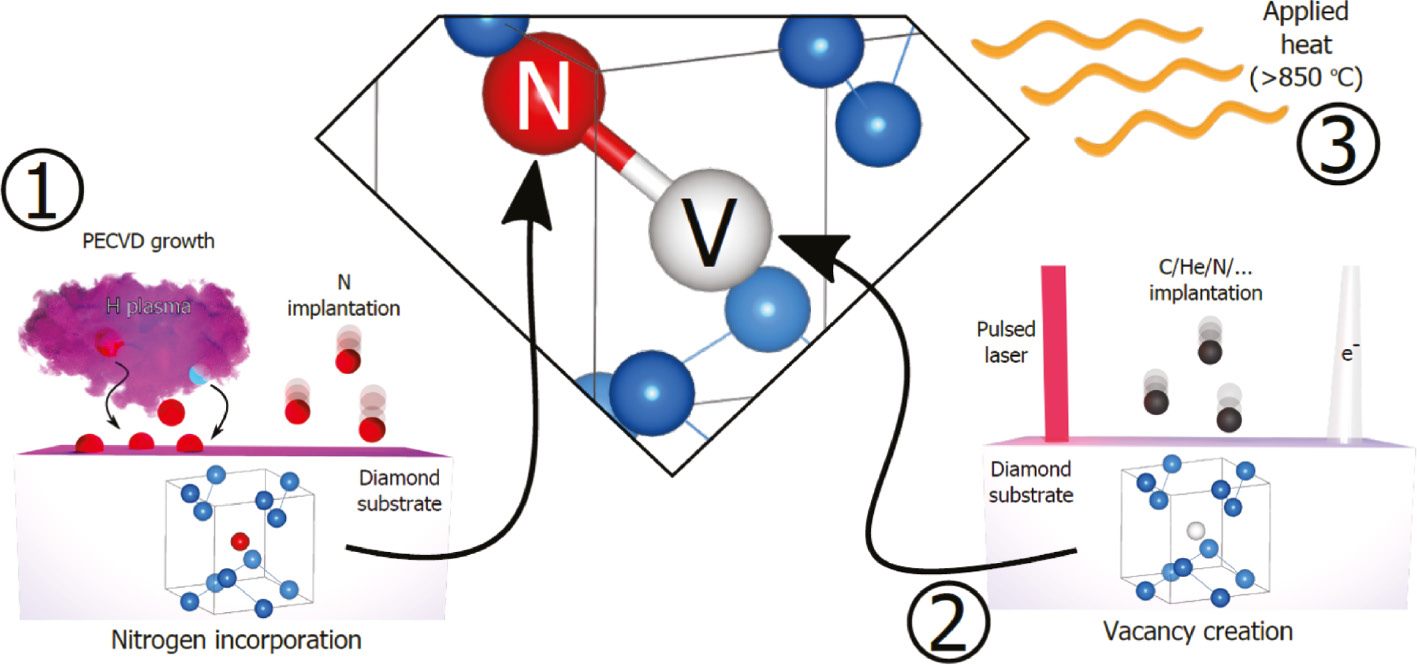
Production of nitrogen-vacancy centers in diamond may require several steps. First, nitrogen must be introduced into the diamond lattice which can be accomplished via ion implantation or CVD delta doping. Secondly, vacancies must be introduced, which can be accomplished via laser irradiation, ion implantation, or electron irradiation. Alternatively, during the nitrogen introduction step, vacancies may also be introduced. Finally, a high-temperature annealing step can help promote NV formation.

During chemical vapor deposition of diamond, a small fraction of single substitutional nitrogen impurity (typically <0.5%) traps vacancies generated as a result of the plasma synthesis. Such nitrogen-vacancy centers are preferentially aligned to the growth direction. Delta doping of nitrogen during CVD growth can be used to create two-dimensional ensembles of NV centers near the diamond surface for enhanced sensing or simulation.

Diamond is notorious for having a relatively large lattice strain. Strain splits and shifts optical transitions from individual centers resulting in broad lines in the ensembles of centers. Special care is taken to produce extremely sharp NV lines (line width ~10 MHz) required for most experiments: high-quality, natural (type IIa) diamonds are selected, although synthetic diamonds are preferential. Many of them already have sufficient concentrations of grown-in NV centers and are suitable for applications. If not, they are irradiated by high-energy particles and annealed. Selection of a certain irradiation dose allows tuning the concentration of produced NV centers such that individual NV centers are separated by micrometre-large distances. Then, individual NV centers can be studied with standard optical microscopes or, better, near-field scanning optical microscopes having sub-micrometre resolution.

== Structure ==
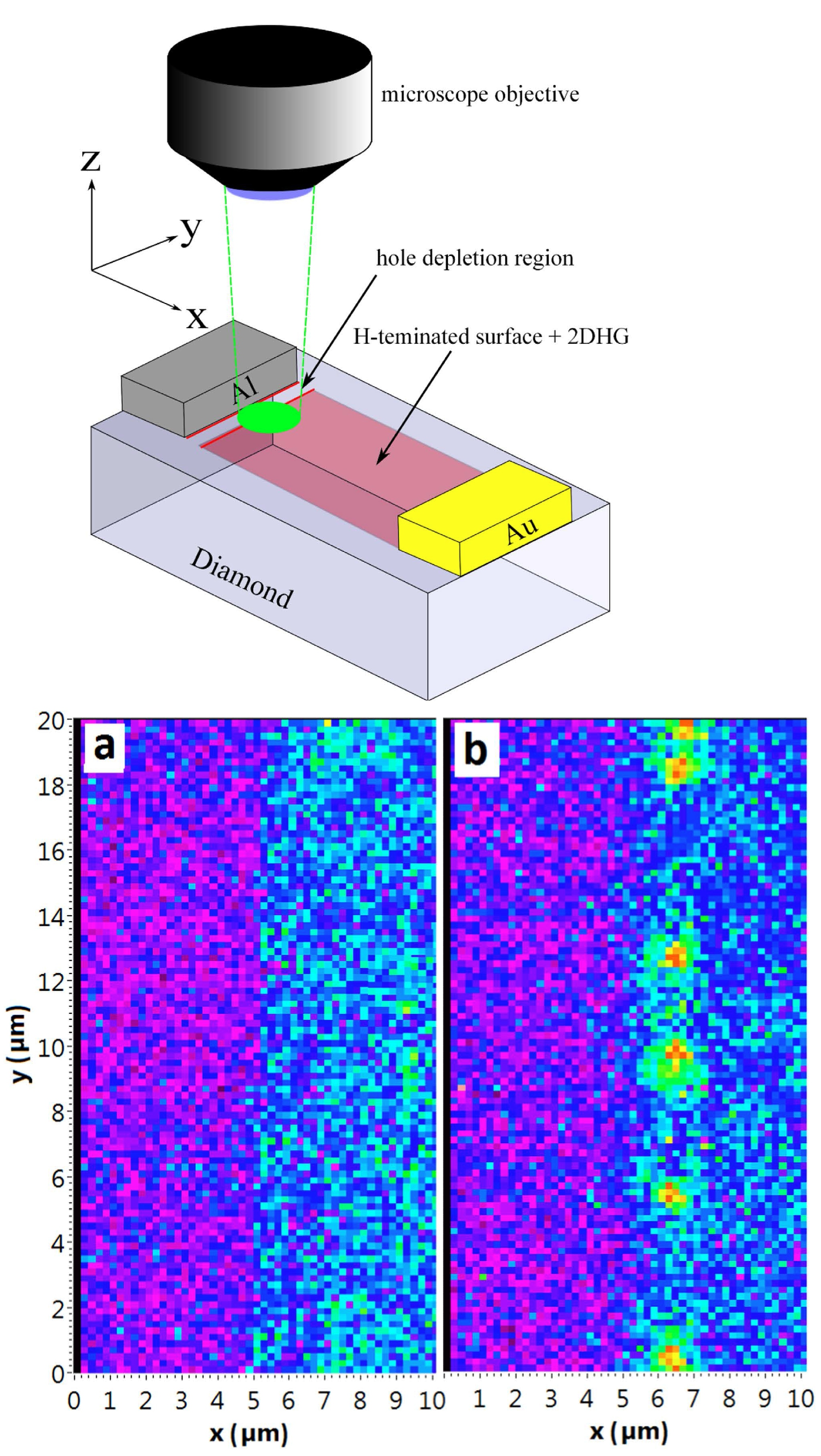
Bottom images are spatial photoluminescence (PL) maps before and after application of +20 V voltage to a planar Schottky diode. The top image outlines the experiment. The PL maps reveal the conversion of individual NV^{0} centers into NV^{−} centers that appear as bright dots.

The nitrogen-vacancy center is a point defect in the diamond lattice. It consists of a nearest-neighbor pair of a nitrogen atom, which substitutes for a carbon atom, and a lattice vacancy.

Two charge states of this defect, neutral NV^{0} and negative NV^{−}, exist. The NV^{0} centers can be converted into NV^{−} by changing the Fermi level position with an external voltage (see § Net charge).

On the one hand, the neutral state is not generally used for quantum technology. The NV^{−} state is commonly, and somewhat incorrectly, called "the nitrogen-vacancy center". On the other hand, the modern, detailed structural understanding of the system originates from theoretical considerations and recent electron resonance (EPR) and optically detected magnetic resonance (ODMR) studies on the paramagnetic NV^{0} state. (Note: Several theoretical works have also attempted to treat the system as a molecule and build molecular orbitals using the Linear Combination of Atomic Orbitals (LCAO) approach.) Other spectroscopies used to describe the system's general structure include optical absorption and photoluminescence (PL).

In the neutral NV^{0}, the nitrogen atom has five valence electrons. Three are covalently bonded to adjacent lattice carbon atoms, while the other two remain a non-bonded lone pair.

The vacancy carries three valence electrons. Two of them form a quasi covalent bond and one remains unpaired. The overall symmetry, however, is axial (trigonal C_{3V}); one can visualize this by imagining the three unpaired vacancy electrons continuously exchanging their roles in a quantum superposition.

In the negative charge state NV^{−}, an extra electron is located at the vacancy site forming a spin S=1 pair with one of the vacancy electrons. Thus there are 6 electrons in total within the NV^{−} center: 3 from the vacancy, 2 from the nitrogen atom, and 1 extra giving it negative charge. This extra electron induces spin triplet ground states of the form |^{3}A⟩ and excited states of the form |^{3}E⟩. There is an additional metastable state that exists between these spin triplets, that often manifests as a singlet. As in NV^{0}, the vacancy electrons preserve the overall trigonal symmetry.

Schematic energy level structure of the NV center. Electron transitions between the ground ^{3}A and excited ^{3}E states, separated by 1.945 eV (637 nm), produce absorption and luminescence. The ^{3}A state is split by 2.87 GHz and the ^{3}E state by 1.42 GHz. Numbers 0, ±1 indicate spin quantum number m_{s}; splitting due to the orbital degeneracy is not shown.

=== Energy levels ===
A NV center has a ground-state triplet (^{3}A), an excited-state triplet (^{3}E) and two intermediate-state singlets (^{1}A and ^{1}E). Both ^{3}A and ^{3}E contain m_{s} = ±1 spin states, in which the two electron spins are aligned (either up, such that m_{s} = +1 or down, such that m_{s} = -1), and an m_{s} = 0 spin state where the electron spins are antiparallel. Due to the magnetic interaction, the energy of the m_{s} = ±1 states is higher than that of the m_{s} = 0 state. ^{1}A and ^{1}E only contain a spin state singlet each with m_{s} = 0. (Note: Group theory results are used to take into account the symmetry of the diamond crystal, and so the symmetry of the NV itself. Followingly, the energy levels are labeled according to group theory, and in particular are labelled after the irreducible representations of the C_{3V} symmetry group of the defect center, A_{1}, A_{2}, and E. The "3" in ^{3}A_{2} and ^{3}E as well as the "1" in ^{1}A_{1} and ^{1}E represent the number of allowable m_{s} spin states, or the spin multiplicity, which range from –S to S for a total of 2S+1 possible states. If S = 1, m_{s} can be −1, 0, or 1.)

As discussed below, many properties of the environment affect the precise energy levels and population of the system states:

1. Amplitude and orientation of a static magnetic field splits the m_{s} = ±1 levels in the ground and excited states.
2. Amplitude and orientation of elastic (strain) or electric fields have a much smaller but also more complex effects on the different levels.
3. Continuous-wave microwave radiation (applied in resonance with the transition between m_{s} = 0 and (one of the) m_{s} = ±1 states) changes the population of the sublevels within the ground and excited state.
4. A tunable laser can selectively excite certain sublevels of the ground and excited states.
5. Surrounding spins and spin–orbit interaction will modulate the magnetic field experienced by the NV center.
6. Temperature and pressure affect different parts of the spectrum including the shift between ground and excited states.

== Electromagnetic coupling ==
The Hamiltonian dynamics of a NV center are approximated extremely well by the following sum of interactions with the electromagnetic field:

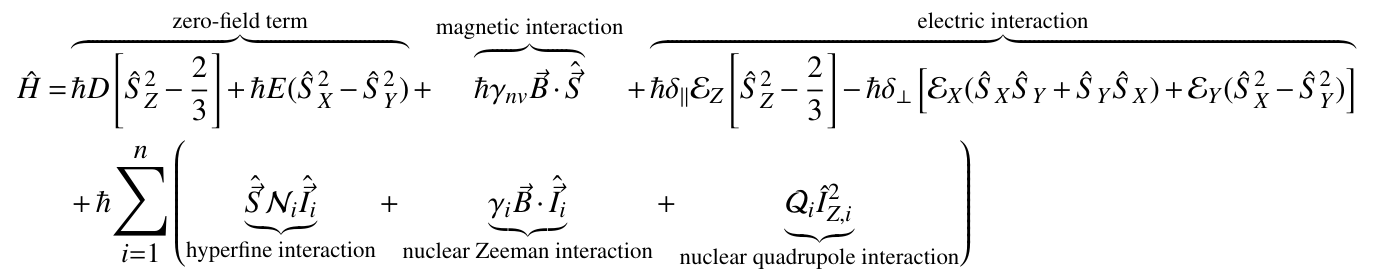

Each term in the Hamiltonian can be measured under the right conditions.

=== Optical properties ===
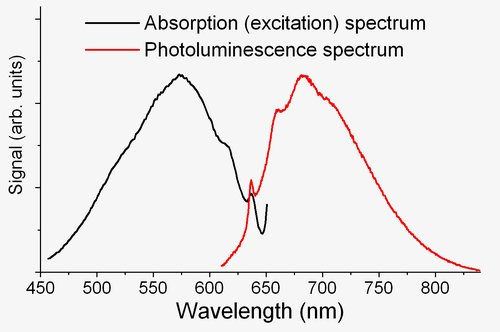
Optical absorption and emission of the NV^{−} center at room temperature.

NV centers emit bright red light (^{3}E→^{3}A transitions), if excited off-resonantly by visible green light (^{3}A →^{3}E transitions). This can be done with convenient light sources such as argon or krypton lasers, frequency doubled Nd:YAG lasers, dye lasers, or He-Ne lasers. Excitation can also be achieved at energies below that of zero phonon emission.

The radiative lifetime of the ^{3}E excited state is around 10 ns in NV^{-} and approximately 20 ns in NV^{0}. At room temperature the NV center's optical spectrum exhibits no sharp peaks due to thermal broadening. However, cooling the NV centers with liquid nitrogen or liquid helium dramatically narrows the lines down to a width of a few MHz. At low temperature it also becomes possible to specifically address the zero-phonon line (ZPL).

An important property of the luminescence from individual NV centers is its high temporal stability. Whereas many single-molecular emitters bleach (i.e. change their charge state and become dark) after emission of 10^{6}–10^{8} photons, bleaching is unlikely for NV centers at room temperature. Strong laser illumination, however, may also convert some NV^{−} into NV^{0} centers.

Because of these properties, the ideal technique to address the NV centers is confocal microscopy, both at room temperature and at low temperature.

== State manipulation ==
Temperature and pressure directly influence the zero-field term of the NV center leading to a shift between the ground and excited state levels.

Spin dynamics in the NV center in diamond. The primary transition between the ground and excited state triplets is spin conserving. Decay via the intermediate singlets gives rise to spin polarization by converting spin from m_{s} = ±1 to m_{s} = 0. Both absorption and emission wavelengths are indicated, since they differ due to Stokes shift. Furthermore, the effect of a static magnetic field B_{0} along the defect axis and the resulting Zeeman shift is indicated. Here, γ_{nv} refers to the gyromagnetic ratio of the NV center. In many applications two of the ground-state levels are then used as a qubit. Transitions in this effective two-level system may be induced using a microwave field. ^{3}E-^{1}A and ^{1}E-^{3}A are non-radiative transitions.

=== Radiative and non-radiative transitions ===
Optical transitions must preserve the total spin and occur only between levels of the same total spin. Specifically, transitions between the ground and excited states (with equal spin) can be induced using a green laser with a wavelength of 546 nm. Transitions ^{3}E→^{1}A and ^{1}E→^{3}A are non-radiative, while ^{1}A →^{1}E has both a non-radiative and infrared decay path.

The non-radiative transition between ^{3}E and ^{1}A is stronger for m_{s} = ±1 and weaker for m_{s} = 0. This asymmetry enables optical spin-polarization, which initializes the quantum state of a qubit for quantum information processing or quantum sensing. To understand the process, first consider an off-resonance excitation which has a higher frequency (typically 2.32 eV (532 nm)) than all transitions and thus couples to each transition through vibron excitation. A pulse of this wavelength will excite all spin states to ^{3}E. Because the transition to ^{1}A is weak for m_{s} = 0, the spin-zero states radiate back to ^{3}A. But states with m_{s} = ±1 often decay nonradiatively to ^{1}A, at which point the system is in a m_{s} = 0 state. Further decay from ^{1}A tends to preserve m_{s} = 0, and after many cycles the system is in the m_{s} = 0 ground state with high probability.

=== Static external fields ===
==== Microwave irradiation ====
The energy difference between the m_{s} = 0 and m_{s} = ±1 states corresponds to the microwave regime. Population can be transferred between the states by applying a resonant magnetic field perpendicular to the defect axis. Numerous dynamic effects (spin echo, Rabi oscillations, etc.) can be exploited by applying a carefully designed sequence of microwave pulses. Such protocols are rather important for the practical realization of quantum computers. By manipulating the population, it is possible to shift the NV center into a more sensitive or stable state. Its own resulting fluctuating fields may also be used to influence the surrounding nuclei or protect the NV center itself from noise. This is typically done using a wire loop (microwave antenna) which creates an oscillating magnetic field.

==== Locally constant fields ====
If a magnetic field is oriented along the defect axis, the Zeeman effect splits the m_{s} = +1 from the m_{s} = -1 states. This technique is used to lift the spin degeneracy and use only two of the spin states (usually the ground states with m_{s} = -1 and m_{s} = 0) as a qubit. In the specific instance that the magnetic field reaches 1028 G (or 508 G) then the m_{s} = –1 and m_{s} = 0 states in the ground (respectively excited) state become equal in energy. In such cases, the spin polarization technique detailed above becomes inefficient.

Zeeman splitting can also be modulated with an external electric field, although the physics of the splitting is somewhat more complex. Crystal strain has a similar effect on the NV center as electric fields.

The hyperfine interactions with nuclear spin (the nuclear Zeeman and quadrupole interactions) also split the m_{s} = ±1 energy levels. Optical pumping can coherently map of the spin states of the nitrogen nucleus to that of the NV center under the application of external magnetic field transverse to the NV symmetry axis. Also the NV center's own spin–orbit interaction and orbital degeneracy leads to additional level splitting in the excited ^{3}E state.

=== Net charge ===
It is also possible to switch the charge state of the NV center (i.e. between NV^{−}, NV^{+} and NV^{0}) by applying a gate voltage. The gate voltage electrically shifts the Fermi level at the diamond surface and changes its surface band bending. Upon varying the gate voltage, individual centers are allowed to switch from an unknown non-fluorescent state to the neutral charge state NV^{0}. The ensemble of centers can be transitioned from NV^{0} to the qubit state NV^{−}. The diamond surface termination additionally influences the charge state of near-surface NV centers. Oxygen termination is known to stabilize the NV^{−}state by reducing surface conductivity and mitigating band bending. This improves charge state stability and coherence. In a similar capacity, nitrogen termination also affects surface properties and can optimize NV centers for specific sensing applications.

Optical excitation methods additionally play a role in charge state manipulation. Illumination with specific wavelengths can induce transitions between charge states. Near-infrared light at 1064 nm has been shown to convert NV^{0} to NV^{−}, enhancing photoluminescence. Additionally, it has been demonstrated that NV^{+} centers can be switched to NV^{0} by photons with energies $\geq$ 1.23 eV.

== Applications ==
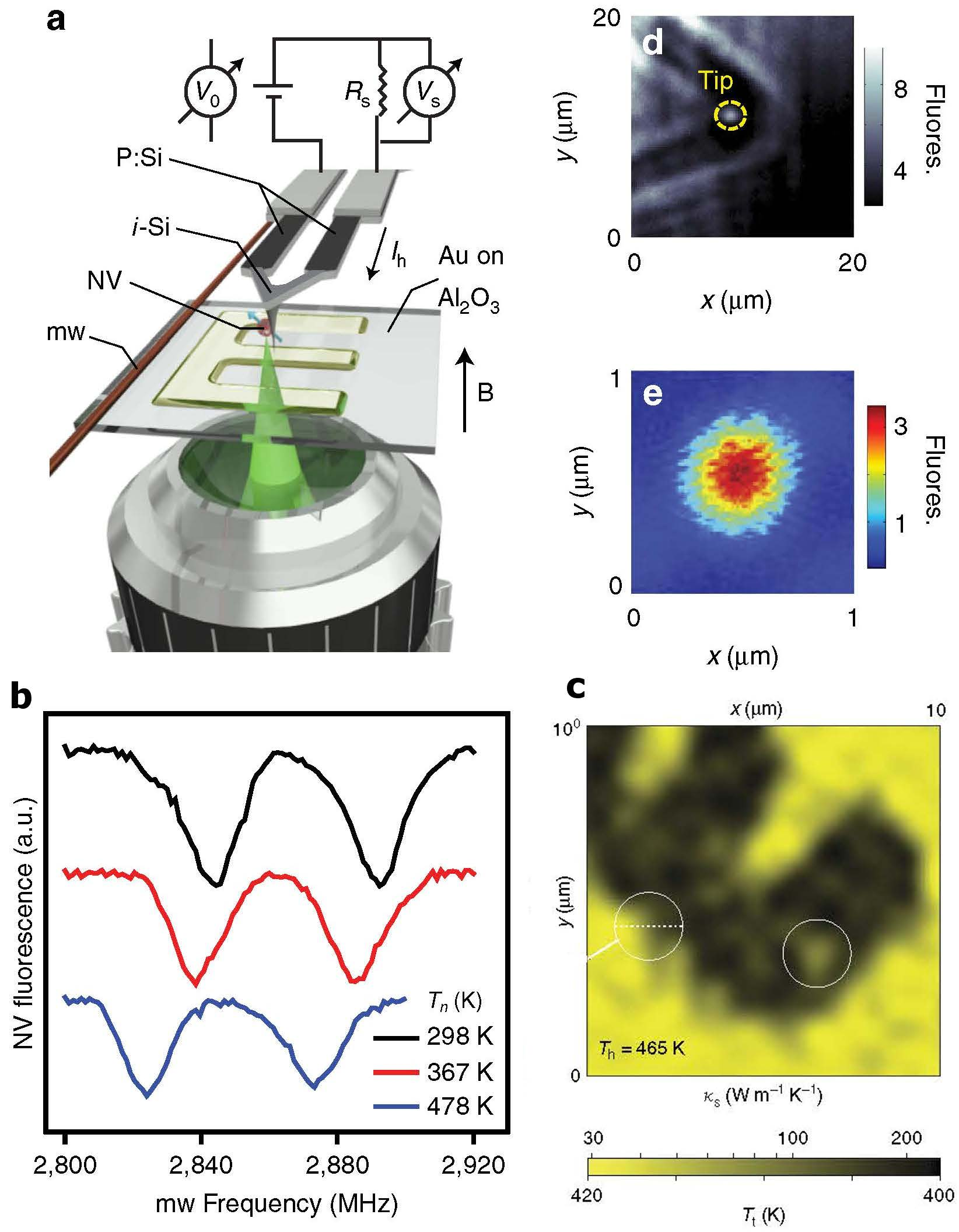
Scanning thermal microscopy using the NV center: (a) Schematics of experimental setup. An electric current is applied to the arms of an AFM cantilever (phosphorus-doped Si, P:Si) and heats up the end section above the tip (intrinsic Si, i-Si). The bottom lens excites a diamond nanocrystal with a green laser light and collects photoluminescence (PL). The crystal hosts an NV center and is attached to the AFM tip. A wire on the sample surface serves as the microwave source (mw). The temperature of the cantilever T_{h} is determined from the applied current and voltage. (b) ODMR spectra of the NV center at three temperatures. The line splitting originates from a ~1 mT applied magnetic field. (c) Thermal conductivity image of a gold letter E on sapphire. White circles indicate features that do not correlate with the AFM topography. (d) PL image of the AFM cantilever end and tip where the diamond nanocrystal appears as the bright spot. (e) Zoomed PL image of the NV center in d.

The NV energy structure is by no means exceptional for a defect in diamond or other semiconductor. It was not this structure alone, but a combination of several favorable factors (previous knowledge, easy production, biocompatibility, simple initialisation, use at room temperature etc.) which suggested the use of the NV center as a qubit and quantum sensor.

The NV center can have a very long spin coherence time approaching the second regime. This is advantageous for applications in quantum sensing and quantum communication. Disadvantageous for these applications is the long radiative lifetime (~12 ns ) of the NV center and the strong phonon sideband in its emission spectrum. Both issues can be addressed by putting the NV center in an optical cavity.

The spectral shape and intensity of the optical signals from the NV^{−} centers are sensitive to external perturbation, such as temperature, strain, electric and magnetic field. However, the use of spectral shape for sensing those perturbation is impractical, as the diamond would have to be cooled to cryogenic temperatures to sharpen the NV^{−} signals. A more realistic approach is to use luminescence intensity (rather than lineshape), which exhibits a sharp resonance when a microwave frequency is applied to diamond that matches the splitting of the ground-state levels. The resulting optically detected magnetic resonance signals are sharp even at room temperature, and can be used in miniature sensors. Such sensors can detect magnetic fields of a few nanotesla or electric fields of about 10 V/cm at kilohertz frequencies after 100 seconds of averaging. This sensitivity allows detecting a magnetic or electric field produced by a single electron located tens of nanometers away from an NV^{−} center.

Using the same mechanism, the NV^{−} centers were employed in scanning thermal microscopy to measure high-resolution spatial maps of temperature and thermal conductivity (see image).

Because the NV center is sensitive to magnetic fields, it is being actively used in scanning probe measurements to study myriad condensed matter phenomena both through measuring a spatially varying magnetic field or inferring local currents in a device.

Another possible use of the NV^{−} centers is as a detector to measure the full mechanical stress tensor in the bulk of the crystal. For this application, the stress-induced splitting of the zero-phonon-line is exploited, and its polarization properties. A robust frequency-modulated radio receiver using the electron-spin-dependent photoluminescence that operated up to 350 °C demonstrates the possibility for use in extreme conditions.

In addition to the quantum optical applications, luminescence from the NV^{−} centers can be applied for imaging biological processes, such as fluid flow in living cells. This application relies on good compatibility of diamond nano-particles with the living cells and on favorable properties of photoluminescence from the NV^{−} centers (strong intensity, easy excitation and detection, temporal stability, etc.). Compared with large single-crystal diamonds, nanodiamonds are cheap (about US$1 per gram) and available from various suppliers. NV^{−} centers are produced in diamond powders with sub-micrometre particle size using the standard process of irradiation and annealing described above. Due to the relatively small size of nanodiamond, NV centers can be produced by irradiating nanodiamond of 100 nm or less with medium energy H+ beam. This method reduces the required ion dose and reaction, making it possible to mass-produce fluorescent nanodiamonds in ordinary laboratory. Fluorescent nanodiamond produced with such method is bright and photostable, making it excellent for long-term, three dimensional tracking of single particle in living cell. Those nanodiamonds are introduced in a cell, and their luminescence is monitored using a standard fluorescence microscope.

Stimulated emission from the NV^{−} center has been demonstrated, though it could be achieved only from the phonon side-band (i.e. broadband light) and not from the ZPL. For this purpose, the center has to be excited at a wavelength longer than ~650 nm, as higher-energy excitation ionizes the center.

The first continuous-wave room-temperature maser has been demonstrated. It used 532-nm pumped NV^{−} centers held within a high Purcell factor microwave cavity and an external magnetic field of 4300 G. Continuous maser oscillation generated a coherent signal at ~9.2 GHz.

The intermediate metastable states ^{1}A and ^{1}E play a crucial role in enabling ground state depletion (GSD) microscopy.

== Historical remarks ==
The microscopic model and most optical properties of ensembles of the NV^{−} centers have been firmly established in the 1970s based on the optical measurements combined with uniaxial stress and on the electron paramagnetic resonance. However, a minor error in EPR results (it was assumed that illumination is required to observe NV^{−} EPR signals) resulted in the incorrect multiplicity assignments in the energy level structure. In 1991 it was shown that EPR can be observed without illumination, which established the energy level scheme shown above. The magnetic splitting in the excited state has been measured only recently.

The characterization of single NV^{−} centers has become a very competitive field nowadays, with many dozens of papers published in prestigious scientific journals. One of the first results was reported back in 1997. In that paper, it was demonstrated that the fluorescence of single NV^{−} centers can be detected by room-temperature fluorescence microscopy and that the defect shows perfect photostability. One of the notable properties of the NV center was also demonstrated, namely room-temperature optically detected magnetic resonance.

Despite extensive efforts, electron paramagnetic resonance signals from NV^{0} avoided detection for decades until 2008. Optical excitation is required to bring the NV^{0} defect into the EPR-detectable excited state; the signals from the ground state are presumably too broad for EPR detection.

== See also ==
- Crystallographic defects in diamond
- Crystallographic defect
- Germanium-vacancy center in diamond
- Material properties of diamond
- Silicon-vacancy center in diamond
