= Bubbler (disambiguation) =

A Bubbler or drinking fountain is a fountain designed to provide drinking water.

- Benson Bubbler, drinking fountains mostly located in Portland, Oregon

Bubbler may also refer to:

- Bubbler (video game), ZX spectrum game
- Bubbler bong, water pipe used for smoking tobacco, cannabis, etc. (long and thin variant used for Crystal meth )
- Bubbler Ranx, Jamaican rapper and singer
- Aquarium bubbler, aquarium accessory
- Bubbler cylinder, component of equipment for metal organic chemical vapor deposition
- Gas bubbler, laboratory glassware
- Deicing bubbler, device used to prevent the ice buildup on water surface
- Bubbler level sensor, a water level sensor based on air bubbles
