= Gas carbon =

Carbon

Gas carbon, or retort carbon, is a form of carbon that is obtained when the destructive distillation of coal is done or when coal gas or petroleum products are heated at high temperatures in a closed container. It appears as a compact, amorphous, gray, crystalline solid left by chemical vapour deposition on the walls of a container or retort. It is a good conductor of heat and electricity, similar to graphite. Unlike graphite, it does not leave marks on paper.

Applications have included battery plates, and in arc lamps. It was also used in early microphones.

Houston in 1883 described its use in arc lighting:

For the manufacture of the carbon electrode, the gas carbon is finely pulverized, washed, and mixed with lamp-black or other pure, finely divided carbon, and made into a paste with syrup, tar, or other carbonizable liquid. It is then forced through an opening in a strong cylinder by hydraulic pressure, and baked at a red heat for several hours, while surrounded by sand or similar material to exclude the air. The carbons are then allowed to cool, and are removed, and again soaked and burned, in order to increase their density and electrical conducting power.

while Atkinson noted in 1898:

For [electric arc carbon] especially, large pieces are in demand, and command a better price... It is, generally speaking, too valuable for use as fuel.

It has a specific gravity of around 2.35 to 2.4.
