= Destructive distillation =

Chemical process

Destructive distillation is a chemical process in which decomposition of unprocessed material is achieved by heating it to a high temperature; the term generally applies to processing of organic material in the absence of air or in the presence of limited amounts of oxygen or other reagents, catalysts, or solvents, such as steam or phenols. It is an application of pyrolysis. The process breaks up or "cracks" large molecules. Coke, coal gas, gaseous carbon, coal tar, ammonia liquor, and coal oil are examples of commercial products historically produced by the destructive distillation of coal.

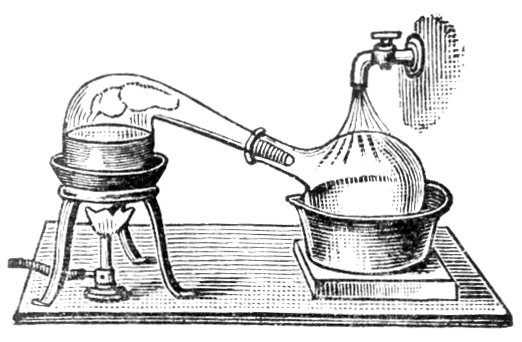
Many early experiments used retorts for destructive distillation.

Destructive distillation of any particular inorganic feedstock produces only a small range of products as a rule, but destructive distillation of many organic materials commonly produces very many compounds, often hundreds, although not all products of any particular process are of commercial importance. The distillate are generally lower molecular weight. Some fractions however polymerise or condense small molecules into larger molecules, including heat-stable tarry substances and chars. Cracking feedstocks into liquid and volatile compounds, and polymerising, or the forming of chars and solids, may both occur in the same process, and any class of the products might be of commercial interest.

Currently the major industrial application of destructive distillation is to coal.

Historically the process of destructive distillation and other forms of pyrolysis led to the discovery of many chemical compounds or elucidation of their structures before contemporary organic chemists had developed the processes to synthesise or specifically investigate the parent molecules. It was especially in the early days that investigation of the products of destructive distillation, like those of other destructive processes, played parts in enabling chemists to deduce the chemical nature of many natural materials. Well known examples include the deduction of the structures of pyranoses and furanoses.

== History ==
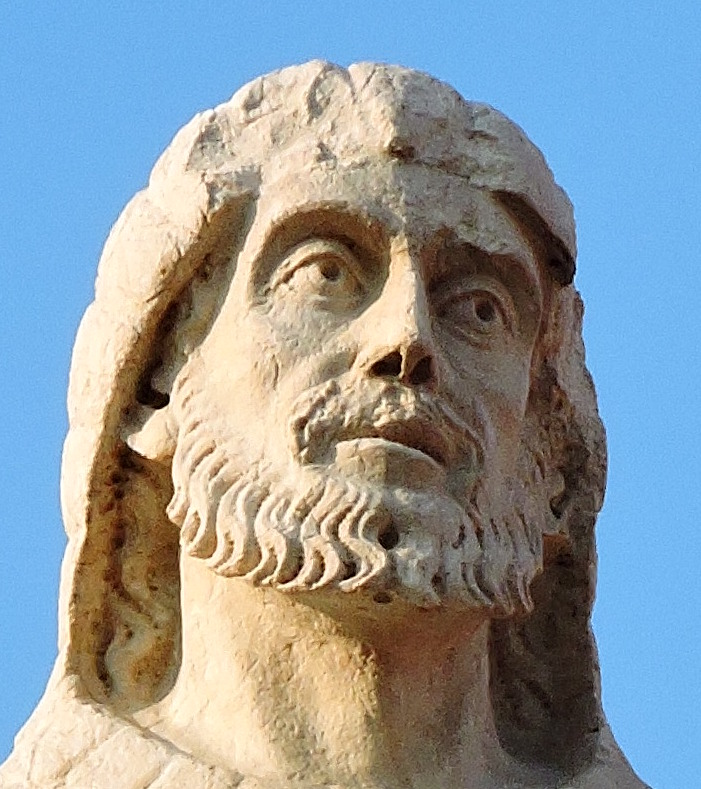
Pliny the Elder

In his encyclopedic work Natural History (Latin: Naturalis Historia) the Roman naturalist and author Pliny the Elder (23/24 –79 CE) describes how, in the destructive distillation of pine wood, two liquid fractions are produced: a lighter (aromatic oils) and a heavier (pitch). The lighter fraction is released in the form of gases, which are condensed and collected.

In Europe, tar is extracted from the torch-tree [Pinus mugo] by the agency of fire; it is employed for coating ships and for many other useful purposes. The wood of the tree is chopped into small billets, and then put into a furnace ... The first steam that exudes flows in the form of [a liquid] into a reservoir made for its reception: in Syria this substance is known as “cedrium” [cedar oil]; and it possesses such remarkable strength, that in Egypt the bodies of the dead, after being steeped in it, are preserved from all corruption. The liquid that follows is of a thicker consistency, and constitutes pitch.

== Process ==
The process of pyrolysis can be conducted in a distillation apparatus (retort) to form the volatile products for collection. The mass of the product will represent only a part of the mass of the feedstock, because much of the material remains as char, ash, and non-volatile tars. In contrast, combustion consumes most of the organic matter, and the net weight of the products amount to roughly the same mass as the fuel and oxidant consumed.

Destructive distillation and related processes are in effect the modern industrial descendants of traditional charcoal burning crafts. As such they are of industrial significance in many regions, such as Scandinavia. The modern processes are sophisticated and require careful engineering to produce the most valuable possible products from the available feedstocks.

== Applications ==
- Destructive distillation of wood produces methanol and acetic acid, together with a solid residue of charcoal.
- Destructive distillation of a tonne of coal can produce 700 kg of coke, 100 liters of liquor ammonia, 50 liters of coal tar and 400 m^{3} of coal gas.
- Destructive distillation is an increasingly promising method for recycling monomers derived from waste polymers.
- Destructive distillation of natural rubber resulted in the discovery of isoprene which led to the creation of synthetic rubbers such as neoprene.

== See also ==
- Dry distillation
- Pyrolysis
- Thermolysis
- Cracking (chemistry)
