= Virtual metrology =

In semiconductor manufacturing, virtual metrology refers to methods to predict the properties of a wafer based on machine parameters and sensor data in the production equipment, without performing the (costly) physical measurement of the wafer properties. Statistical methods such as classification and regression are used to perform such a task. Depending on the accuracy of this virtual data, it can be used in modelling for other purposes, such as predicting yield, preventative analysis, etc. This virtual data is helpful for modelling techniques that are adversely affected by missing data. Another option to handle missing data is to use imputation techniques on the dataset, but virtual metrology in many cases, can be a more accurate method.

Examples of virtual metrology include:

- the prediction of the silicon nitride ($Si_3 N_4$) layer thickness in the chemical vapor deposition process (CVD), using multivariate regression methods;
- the prediction of critical dimension in photolithography, using multi-level and regularization approaches;
- the prediction of layer width in etching.
