= Chemical vapor deposition of ruthenium =

Methods of adding ruthenium on a substrate material

Chemical vapor deposition of ruthenium is a method to deposit thin layers of ruthenium on substrates by chemical vapor deposition (CVD).

A unique challenge arises in trying to grow impurity-free films of a catalyst in chemical vapor deposition (CVD). Ruthenium metal activates C–H and C–C bonds, that aids C–H and C–C bond scission. This creates a potential catalytic decomposition path for all metal-organic CVD precursors that is likely to lead to significant carbon incorporation. Platinum, a chemically similar catalyst, catalyzes dehydrogenation of five- and six-member cyclic hydrocarbons into benzene. The d-bands of ruthenium lie higher than those in platinum, generally predicting stronger ruthenium–adsorbate bonds than on platinum. Therefore, it is likely that ruthenium also catalyzes dehydrogenation of five- and six-member hydrocarbon rings to benzene. Benzene dehydrogenates further on ruthenium surfaces into hydrocarbon fragments similar to those formed by acetylene and ethene on ruthenium surfaces. In addition to benzene, acetylene and ethene, pyridine also decomposes on ruthenium surfaces, leaving bound fragments on the surface. Ruthenium is unusually well studied in the surface science and catalysis literature due to its industrial importance as a catalyst. There are many studies of individual molecular behavior on ruthenium in surface science. However, understanding the behavior of each ligand on its own is not equivalent to understanding their behavior when co-adsorbed with each other and with the precursor. While there is no significant pressure difference between surface science studies and CVD, there is often a temperature gap between temperatures reported in surface science studies and CVD growth temperatures. Despite these complications, ruthenium is a promising candidate for understanding chemical vapor deposition and precursor design of catalytic films.

Ligands that are stable compounds in their own right, short ligand–ruthenium contact times and moderate substrate temperatures help minimize unwanted ligand decomposition on the surface. The C–H and C–C bond activation is temperature-dependent. Product desorption is also temperature-dependent, if the products are not bound to the ruthenium surface. This suggests that there is some optimum temperature, at which most independently stable ligands have just enough thermal energy to desorb from the ruthenium film surface before C–H activation can occur. For example, benzene starts decomposing on ruthenium at 87 °C. However, the dehydrogenation reaction does not go to fragments until 277 °C, and compete fragmentation is not seen at low surface coverage. This suggests that provided adsorbed benzene molecules are not close to one another on the surface and temperatures are below 277 °C, the vast majority of benzene molecules may not contribute to carbon incorporation in films. Therefore, a key consideration in growing CVD films of catalytic metals such as ruthenium is combining molecule design and the kinetic aspects of growth in a favorable way.

Before metal-organic precursors were explored, triruthenium dodecacarbonyl (Ru_{3}(CO)_{12}) was tested as a CVD precursor. While this precursor gives good-quality films, the vapor pressure is poor, complicating its practical use in a CVD process. Ruthenocene and bis(ethylcyclopentadienyl)ruthenium(II) and beta-diketonate ruthenium(II) compounds have been fairly extensively explored. Although these precursors also can give pure films of low resistivity when reacted with oxygen, the growth rates are very low or not reported. One high-growth precursor, cyclopentadienyl-propylcyclopentadienylruthenium(II) (RuCp(i-PrCp)), has been identified. (RuCp(i-PrCp) has achieved growth rates of 7.5 nm/min to 20 nm/min as well as low resistivities. However, it does not nucleate on oxides, ruling out its use in all applications but copper interconnect layers.

A new zero-valent, single-source precursor design paradigm was launched with (1,5-cyclooctadiene)(toluene)Ru(0) ((1,5-COD)(toluene)Ru) and (1,3-cyclohexadiene)(benzene)Ru(0) ((1,3-CHD)(benzene)Ru), also independently tested Using (1,5-COD)(toluene)Ru; it was found that C–H bonds were readily activated in 1,5-COD. Although carbon incorporation levels were low (1–3%), the growth rates were only around 0.28 nm/min at best. Using (1,3-CHD)(benzene)Ru, the 1,3-CHD was dehydrogenated to benzene as expected, but the large variety of possible surface reactions involving the two ligands resulted in a narrow process window in which carbon concentrations were low.
