= Bubbler cylinder =

A Bubbler cylinder is a component of a unit for the metal organic chemical vapor deposition (MOCVD). They are devices that are used for conveying electronic grade metalorganic compounds from a liquid or solid precursor into a usable vapor. Other popular application of this apparatus are humidification or deoxygenation of a flowing gas.

== Apparatus ==
The container of the Bubblers is similar to the construction of a gas washing bottle and used for the protected storage of metalorganic compounds to exclude air (oxygen, moisture). The bubbler has a supply pipe and a sampling tube. The inlet tube ends just before the bottom of the tube. In this tube, an inert gas is introduced, which bubbles through the liquid chemical; a solid chemical will sublime. The mixture of the controlled inert gas and the vaporized chemical leaves the cylinder into a downstream reaction vessel. The temperature is controlled by a thermostat, so that a defined, constant steam pressure can be achieved. The supply of the often expensive and sensitive chemical is controlled by the regulated flow of inert gas and the temperature of the bubbler, resulting in a given vapor pressure of the chemical.

The tube between the bubbler and the reactor has to have a higher temperature than the bubble, otherwise the precursor would condense in the tube and therefore uncontrolled droplets would be passed into the reaction vessel. If this happens with a solid precursor, it could plug the line.

== Application ==
For example, during the production of high brightness light emitting diodes, gallium or other group III-V elements are epitaxially deposited onto a single crystal silicon substrate. The gallium is introduced into the MOVPE reactor chamber via a vapor. This vapor is generated by bubbling an inert carrier gas (such as nitrogen or argon) through a cylinder with a dip tube through a metalorganic precursor, such as trimethylgallium. The inert carrier gas and the metalorganic vapor is then introduced into the MOVPE (or MOCVD) reactor chamber during the production of high brightness LEDs.
