= List of metal-organic chemical vapour deposition precursors =

In chemistry, a precursor is a compound that contributes in a chemical reaction and produces another compound, or a chemical substance that gives rise to another more significant chemical product. Since several years metal-organic compounds are widely used as molecular precursors for the chemical vapor deposition process (MOCVD). The success of this method is mainly due to its adaptability and to the increasing interest for the low temperature deposition processes. Correlatively, the increasing demand of various thin film materials for new industrial applications is also a significant reason for the rapid development of MOCVD. Certainly, a wide variety of materials which could not be deposited by the conventional halide CVD process, because halide reactive do not exist or are not volatile, can now be grown by MOCVD. This includes metals and different multi-component materials such as semiconductor and intermetallic compounds as well as carbides, nitrides, oxides, borides, silicides and chalcogenides. Further significant advantages of MOCVD over physical processes are a capability for large scale production, an easier automation, a good conformal coverage, the selectivity and the ability to produce metastable materials.

Thus, effort has been directed at the synthesis of new molecular precursors. An overview is provided by several reviews covering fields of MOCVD such as, epitaxial growth of semiconductor compounds, and low temperature deposition of metals. An overview of metal-organic compounds used for the MOCVD growth of different kind of materials is reported in the following reviews. This is a list of precursor complexes synthesized thus far with suitable properties to be utilized for MOCVD processes.

== List ==
Precursor, name, formula	CAS No.	Chemical stability	Themal stability	Evaporation T (pressure)	Vapour pressure (oC/Torr)	Decomposition T	Oligommerization	Crystal structure	Melting point	TG data	DSC	IR spectra	NMR data	Solubility	References
Li(TMHD), Lithium tetramethylheptanedionate, C_{11}H_{19}LiO_{2}	22441-13-0	Decomposes at low pressure and room temperatures, stable under N_{2} or Ar in sealed contanier and decomposes slowly in contact with moist air and rapidly in contact with water.	Above 215 °C under high vacuum it decomposes to form ketenes and carbanions	268-270 °C (atmospehric pressure)			NA		265-268 °C					Soluble in water	D. Saulys, V. Joshkin, M. Khoudiakov, T.F. Kuech, A.B. Ellis, S.R. Oktyabrsky, L. McCaughan, Journal of Crystal Growth 217 (2000) 287-301
Lithium bis(trimethylsilyl)amide, LiN(SiMe_{3})_{2}	4039-	Reacts violently with water.							70-72 °C						J. Hamalainen, J. Holopainen, F. Munnik, T. Hatanpaa, M. Heikkila, M. Ritala, and M. Leskela, J Electrochem Soc, 159, A259 (2012).
Lithium bis(ethyldimethylsilyl)amide, [Li(NSiMe2Et)_{2}]_{2}	300585-49-3				122/0.2										Broomhall-Dillard, R. N. R., Gordon, R. G., & Wagner, V. A., MRS Proceedings, 1999, 606
Lithium tert-amyl(i-propyldimethylsilyl)amide					137/0.2										Broomhall-Dillard, R. N. R., Gordon, R. G., & Wagner, V. A., MRS Proceedings, 1999, 606
Lithium bis(3,3-dimethylbutyldimethylsilyl)amide					225/0.9										Broomhall-Dillard, R. N. R., Gordon, R. G., & Wagner, V. A., MRS Proceedings, 1999, 606
Lithium tert-amyl(i-butyldimethylsilyl)amide					145/0.1										Broomhall-Dillard, R. N. R., Gordon, R. G., & Wagner, V. A., MRS Proceedings, 1999, 606
Lithium tert-amyl(n-propyldimethylsilyl)amide					171/0.3										Broomhall-Dillard, R. N. R., Gordon, R. G., & Wagner, V. A., MRS Proceedings, 1999, 606
Lithium bis(n-propyldimethylsilyl)amide					130/0.15										Broomhall-Dillard, R. N. R., Gordon, R. G., & Wagner, V. A., MRS Proceedings, 1999, 606
Lithium bis(i-butyldimethylsilyl)amide					145/0.05										Broomhall-Dillard, R. N. R., Gordon, R. G., & Wagner, V. A., MRS Proceedings, 1999, 606
Lithium tert-amyl(triethylsilyl)amide					157/0.095										Broomhall-Dillard, R. N. R., Gordon, R. G., & Wagner, V. A., MRS Proceedings, 1999, 606
Lithium bis(n-butyldimethylsilyl)amide					145/0.085										Broomhall-Dillard, R. N. R., Gordon, R. G., & Wagner, V. A., MRS Proceedings, 1999, 606
Lithium dimethylamide, (CH_{3})_{2}NLi	3585-33-9	Catches fire spontaneously if exposed to air and in contact with water releases flammable gas.													https://pubchem.ncbi.nlm.nih.gov/compound/Lithium-dimethylamide
Dicyclohexylamidolithium, C_{12}H_{24}Li_{2}N	4111-55-1		High sublimation temperature of 250 °C at which it is also partly thermally decomposing.	250 °C											Putkonen, M., Aaltonen, T., Alnes, M., Sajavaara, T., Nilsen, O., & Fjellvåg, H., Journal of Materials Chemistry, 2009, 19(46), 8767
Li(acac), Lithium acetylacetonate, C_{5}H_{7}LiO_{2}	18115-70-3	Hygroscopic		Aerosol					250 °C					Methanol	V. Bornand, Ph. Papet, E. Philippot, Thin Solid Films 1997, 304, 239.
Lithium ethoxide, LiC_{2}H_{5}O	2388-07-0	Self heating and reacts violently with water.	Decomposes at 325 °C. LiOEt is insoluble in hydrocarbons, soluble in EtOH (125g/L), α = 6, 4 (MS), ΔHform = -108.6	Powder subliming at 100 °C/vacuo, 150 °C /10-2 torr.											https://www.sigmaaldrich.com/catalog/product/aldrich/400203?lang=en
Lithium isopropoxide C_{3}H_{7}LiO	2388-10-5	"Sensitive to moisture and reacts with water. Material decomposes slowly in contact with moist air and rapidly in contact with water, possibly igniting. Avoid contact with moist air, water, acids, alcohols, ketones, esters, carbon dioxide, halogens."	Highly flammable, stable under nitrogen or argon in sealed containers					Lithium isopropoxide C3H7LiO							https://pubchem.ncbi.nlm.nih.gov/compound/Lithium-isopropoxide#section=Chemical-and-Physical-Properties
[Li(OtBu)]6, Lithium tert-butoxide, C_{4}H_{9}LiO	1907-33-1	Stable to light, heat, air, carbon dioxide and strong acids. Moisture sensitive, vigorous reaction to water.		108-115 °C [1,2]					283 °C					Soluble in toluene, hexane, tetrahydrofuran and methyl tert-butyl ether.	" A. Dabirian, Y. Kuzminykh, S. C. Sandu, S. Harada, E. Wagner, P. Brodard, G. Benvenuti, S.Rushworth, P. Muralt, P. Hoffmann, Cryst. Growth Des. 2011, 1, 203. A. Tanaka, K. Miyashita, T. Tashiro, M. Kimura, T. Sukegawa, J. Cryst. Growth 1995, 148, 324. J. Hamalainen, J. Holopainen, F. Munnik, T. Hatanpaa, M. Heikkila, M. Ritala, and M. Leskela, J Electrochem Soc, 159, A259 (2012). Sigma-Aldtritch"
LiTa(OEt)_{6}	127503-04-2	The double alkoxides have sufficient stability using parent alcohol as solvent. Decomposes in contact with water.	The thermal stability and volatility vary with respect to the reaction in solid or liquid state.		230/0.2										https://www.chemicalbook.com/ChemicalProductProperty_EN_CB2739827.htm
lithium hexa-iso-propoxytantalate LiTa(i-OPr)_{6}					160-180/0.1										https://www.tms.org/pubs/journals/JOM/9710/Xu/Xu-9710.html
LiTa(t-OBut)_{6}					110-120/0.1										https://www.tms.org/pubs/journals/JOM/9710/Xu/Xu-9710.html
Lithium niobium ethoxide, LiNb(OC_{2}H_{5})_{6}		Moisture Sensitive													Suyama, Y., Yamada, T., Hirano, Y., Takamura, K., & Takahashi, K. (2010). New Synthesis Process of Li, Na and K Niobates from Metal Alkoxides. Advances in Science and Technology, 63, 7–13. doi:10.4028/www.scientific.net/ast.63.7
LiNb(i-OPr)_{6}					<140/0.2										https://www.tms.org/pubs/journals/JOM/9710/Xu/Xu-9710.html
LiNb(t-OBut)_{6}					110-120/0.1										https://www.tms.org/pubs/journals/JOM/9710/Xu/Xu-9710.html
Sodium niobium ethoxide, NaNb(OC_{2}H_{5})_{6}		Moisture Sensitive													Suyama, Y., Yamada, T., Hirano, Y., Takamura, K., & Takahashi, K. (2010). New Synthesis Process of Li, Na and K Niobates from Metal Alkoxides. Advances in Science and Technology, 63, 7–13. doi:10.4028/www.scientific.net/ast.63.7
Sodium cyclopentadienide, C_{5}H_{5}Na	4984-82-1	In contact with water releases flammable gases which may ignite spontaneously.												Soluble in THF, benzene or liq. NH_{3}	"1. (a) Fischer, E. O.; Jira, R.; Hafner, K. Z. Naturforsch. 1953, 8b,(b) Fischer, E. O.; Hafner, W.; Stahl, H. O. Z. Anorg. Allg. Chem.1955, 282, 47. 2. Fehlhammer, W. P.; Herrmann, W. A.; O¨ fele, K. In Synthetic Methods of Organometallic and Inorganic Chemistry; Herrmann, W.A., Brauer, G., Eds.; Thieme: Stuttgart, 1997; Vol. 3, p 50. 3.https://spectrabase.com/spectrum/IMGzWBmNgJE. 4.https://pubchem.ncbi.nlm.nih.gov/compound/Sodium-cyclopentadienide#section=GHS-Classification"
Sodium hexafluoroacetylacetonate, NaC_{5}HF_{6}O_{2}	22466-49-5				25/10.3			Sodium hexafluoroacetylacetonate, NaC5HF6O2	230 °C					Soluble in water and warm methoxypropanol.	1. Zh. Neorg. Khim. 41, 411, (1996). 2. Rec. Trav. Chim. 114, 242, (1995)
Sodium 2,2,6,6-tetramethylheptane-3,5-dionate, Na(thd)	22466-43-9			Sublimes between 170 and 255 °C				Sodium 2,2,6,6-tetramethylheptane-3,5-dionate, Na(thd)							M. Tiitta, M. Leskäla, E. Nykänen, P. Soinen, L. Niinstö, Thermochim. acta, 1995, 256 (1), 47-53
Sodium 2,2,6,6-tetramethylheptane-3,5-dionate phenantroline, Na(thd)(phen)				Sublimes around 210 °C											D. Tsymbarenko, I. Korsakov, A. Mankevich, G. Girichev, E. Pelevina, A. Kaul, ECS Trans., 2009, vol.25, Iss.8, 633-638
Sodium 2,2,6,6-tetramethylheptane-3,5-dionate 2,2'-bipiridyne, Na(thd)(bipy)			It decomposes at 2 stages namely around 90 °C and 140 °C												D. Tsymbarenko, I. Korsakov, A. Mankevich, G. Girichev, E. Pelevina, A. Kaul, ECS Trans., 2009, vol.25, Iss.8, 633-638
Sodium-niobium hexakis(isopropoxide), NaNb(OiPr)_{6}					110-120/0.1										
Sodium bis(n-propyldimethylsilyl)amide					213/0.3										Broomhall-Dillard, R. N. R., Gordon, R. G., & Wagner, V. A., MRS Proceedings, 1999, 606
Sodium bis(i-butyldimethylsilyl)amide					189/0.08										Broomhall-Dillard, R. N. R., Gordon, R. G., & Wagner, V. A., MRS Proceedings, 1999, 606
Sodium bis(n-butyldimethylsilyl)amide					231/0.5										Broomhall-Dillard, R. N. R., Gordon, R. G., & Wagner, V. A., MRS Proceedings, 1999, 606
Sodium bis(n-hexyldimethylsill)amide					265/0.3										Broomhall-Dillard, R. N. R., Gordon, R. G., & Wagner, V. A., MRS Proceedings, 1999, 606
Sodium Tert Butoxide, NaOC(CH_{3})_{3}	865-48-5	Stable at room temperature. Decomposes at 300 °C; stable under N2 or Ar in sealed container and decomposes slowly in contact with moist air and violently in contact with water.	At 300 °C	sublimation: 254 °C (atmospheric pressure)	Information not available	Information not available			263 °C					"• 30 g/L at 20 °C Medium: tert-butyl alcohol • 70 g/L at 20 °C Medium: Toluene • 130 g/L at 20 °C Medium: Hexane • 380 g/L at 20 °C Medium: Tetrahydrofuran • 50 g/L at 20 °C Medium: xylene • 110 g/L at 20 °C Medium: octane • 220 g/L at 20 °C Medium: Diethyl ether • 450 g/L at 20 °C Medium: Dimethylformamide	": https://www.nwmissouri.edu/naturalsciences/sds/s/Sodium%20tert-butoxide.pdf: https://www.albemarle.com/storage/components/T401225.PDF: Simone Manzini, Núria Huguet, Oliver Trapp, Rocco A. Paciello, Thomas Schaub; "Synthesis of acrylates from olefins and CO2 using sodium alkoxides as bases" Catalysis Today, Volume 281, Part 2, 2017, Pages 379–386, ISSN 0920-5861
Potassium-niobium hexakis(ethoxide), KNb(OEt)_{6}					200/0.8										Suyama, Y., Yamada, T., Hirano, Y., Takamura, K., & Takahashi, K. (2010). New Synthesis Process of Li, Na and K Niobates from Metal Alkoxides. Advances in Science and Technology, 63, 7–13. doi:10.4028/www.scientific.net/ast.63.7
Potassium tert-butoxide (KOtBu) C_{4}H_{9}KO	865-47-4		Sublimes at temperature of 220 °C at pressure of 1 Torr	NA	220/1				256 °C-258 °C					Soluble in hexane, toluene, diethyl ether and tetrahydrofuran.	Feuer et al.Journal of the American Chemical Society1956vol. 78p. 4364,4367 https://www.sigmaaldrich.com/catalog/product/aldrich/156671?lang=de&region=DE Labbow, R., Michalik, D., Reiß, F., Schulz, A. and Villinger, A., 2016. Isolation of Labile Pseudohalogen NSO Species. Angewandte Chemie International Edition, 55(27), pp. 7680–7684.
Potassium 2,2,6,6-tetramethylheptane-3,5-dionate, K(thd), K(tmhd), K(dpm), C11H19KO2	22441-14-1	Hygroscopic						Potassium 2,2,6,6-tetramethylheptane-3,5-dionate, K(thd), K(tmhd), K(dpm), C11H19KO2	195 °C						1. Onoe, A., Tasaki, Y., & Chikuma, K. (2005). Anomalous evaporation characteristics of vitrificated K(DPM) and stable gas supply using disk-shaped K(DPM) precursors for metalorganic chemical vapor deposition. Journal of Crystal Growth, 277(1-4), 546–554. doi:10.1016/j.jcrysgro.2005.01.077 2. www.molbase.com
Potassium 2,2,6,6-tetramethylheptane-3,5-dionate phenantroline, K(thd)(phen)				320-330 °C			Oligomerizes with n up to 7								D. Tsymbarenko, I. Korsakov, A. Mankevich, G. Girichev, E. Pelevina, A. Kaul, ECS Trans., 2009, vol.25, Iss.8, 633-638
Bi(phenyl)3,Triphenylbismuth(III), (C_{6}H_{5})_{3}Bi	603-33-8		No specific storage condition						76-80 °C						Sigma
Fe(tmhd)3,Tris(2,2,6,6-tetramethyl-3,5-heptanedionato)iron(III), Fe(C_{11}H_{19}O_{2})_{3}	14876-47-2							Fe(tmhd)3,Tris(2,2,6,6-tetramethyl-3,5-heptanedionato)iron(III), Fe(C11H19O2)3	164 °C (Atm) (STREM); 179-185 °C (lit.) (Sigma)						Sigma Strem
Ni(hfa)2tmeda				Evaporation occurs in the 120–200 _C temperature range, with about 2%residue at 350 _C (Atm under N2)"	120–200 °C (Atm pressure under N2)				106,7°C						Sergio Battiato, Maria M. Giangregorio, Maria R. Catalano, Raffaella Lo Nigro, Maria Losurdo and Graziella Malandrino; RSC Adv., 2016, 6, 30813–30823
Ni(tta)2tmeda				evaporated quantitatively in the 200–330 _C range, with less than 2% residue le at 350_°C. (Atm under N2)				2774(2) A˚ 3, Z = 4, Dc = 1.478 g cm−3	147–149°C				to request	to request	Sergio Battiato, Maria M. Giangregorio, Maria R. Catalano, Raffaella Lo Nigro, Maria Losurdo and Graziella Malandrino; RSC Adv., 2016, 6, 30813–30823
Ni(tmhd)2,Nickel(II) bis(2,2,6,6-tetramethyl-3,5-heptanedionate), Ni(OCC(CH_{3})_{3}CHCOC(CH_{3})_{3})_{2}	14481-08-4								219-223°C (Atm)						Maria Losurdo and Graziella Malandrino; RSC Adv., 2016, 6, 30813–30823 Malandrino, Graziella & M S Perdicaro, Laura & Condorelli, Giuseppe & Fragalà, Ignazio & Rossi, Patrizia & Dapporto, Paolo. (2006). Dalton transactions (Cambridge, England : 2003). 8. 1101-6. 10.1039/b511317b.
Ni(acac)2, Nickel(II) acetylacetonate, Ni(C_{5}H7O_{2})_{2}	3264-82-2								230 - 240°C					ethers and aromatic and halogenated hydrocarbons	SIGMA Malandrino, Graziella & M S Perdicaro, Laura & Condorelli, Giuseppe & Fragalà, Ignazio & Rossi, Patrizia & Dapporto, Paolo. (2006). Dalton transactions (Cambridge, England : 2003). 8. 1101-6. 10.1039/b511317b. A. Pande, Synlett, 2005, 6, 1042–1043
La(hfa)3diglyme			nonhygroscopic, can be handled in air	"TGA, 10 ""Clmin under N2) reveal that the sublimation processes takes place in the 115-295°C (residue = 2% to 300°C)"					74-76 °C					Ethanol, chloroform, acetone, pentane, toluene and slightly soluble in cyclohexane	Graziella Malandrino, Rosalia Licata, Francesco Castelli, Ignazio L. Fragala, and Cristiano Benelli Inorganic Chemistry 1995 34 (25), 6233-6234"
Nb(THD)4, Niobium tetrakis(2,2,6,6-tetramethylheptane-3,5-dionate), C_{44}H_{76}NbO_{8}	41706-15-4	Air and moisture stable, insoluble in water.	Under atmospheric pressure and inert atmosphere Li(thd) evaporates completely before ≈270 °C without decomposition. Heating of Nb(thd)4 under similar conditions results in a solid residue of ≈7% what shows that evaporation and decomposition of this compound goes simultaneously (full decomposition of Nb(thd)4 to Nb2O5 should leave 16.1% residue).						219-220 °C					1,2-dimethoxyethane	S. Margueron, A. Bartasyte, V. Plausinaitiene, A. Abrutis, P. Boulet, V. Kubilius, Z. Saltyte, Proc. SPIE 2013, 8626, 862612.
Nb(thd)2Cl3, Bis-dipivaloylmethanate niobium N-chloride, C_{4}H_{10}Cl_{3}NbO_{2}	110615-13-9	Air sensitive. Hydrolyses readily.		170 °C					230 °C						S. Jung, N. Imaish, Korean, J. Chem. Eng. 1999, 16, 229. Sigma-Aldritch
Niobium pentakis(methoxide), Nb(OMe)_{5}		Low volatility		200 °C											B. J. Curtis, H. R. Brunner, Mater. Res. Bull. 1975, 10, 515.
Nb(OEt)_{5} , Niobium pentaethoxide, C_{10}H_{25}NbO_{5}	3236-82-6	Air and moisture sensitive. Incompatible with strong acids and strong oxidizing agents.		135-145 °C 100-120 °C					5-6 °C					Dry touluene, ethanol.	Y. Sakashita, H. Segawa, J. Appl. Phys. 1995, 77, 5995 Y. Akiyama, K. Shitanaka, H. Murakami, Y. S. Shin, M. Yoshida, N. Imaishi, Thin Solid Films 2007, 515, 4975. Sigma-Aldritch
Niobium ethoxide, Nb(OCH_{2}CH_{3})_{5}	3236-82-6	Stable at room temperature. Stable under N2 or Ar in sealed container and decomposes quickly in contact with moist air. Reacts with water.	At 325-350 °C	Information not available	21.5 kPa at 500 K	At 325-350 °C	Dimer		At 5 °C					Soluble in organic solvents. Decomposes in water.Miscible with organic solvents	: https://www.gelest.com/wp-content/uploads/product_msds/AKN590-msds.pdf: Rahtu, Antti (2002). Atomic Layer Deposition of High Permittivity Oxides: Film Growth and In Situ Studies (Thesis). University of Helsinki. ISBN 952-10-0646-3: Niobium(V) ethoxide: Cai Ya-nan, Yang Sheng-hai, Jin Sheng-ming, Yang Hai-ping, Hou Guo-feng, Xia Jiao-yun,"Electrochemical synthesis, characterization and thermal properties of niobium ethoxide"; J. Cent. South Univ. Technol. (2011) 18: 73−77: https://www.chemicalbook.com/ChemicalProductProperty_EN_CB3759592.htm
Pentakis(dimethylamino)tantalum(V), Ta(N(CH_{3})_{2})_{5}	19824-59-0	Reacts violently with water						Pentakis(dimethylamino)tantalum(V), Ta(N(CH3)2)5	100^{o}C						https://www.sigmaaldrich.com/catalog/product/aldrich/496863?lang=en
Tantalum(V) ethoxide, Ta(OC_{2}H_{5})_{5}	6074-84-6								21^{o}C						https://www.sigmaaldrich.com/catalog/product/aldrich/760404?lang=en
Tris(diethylamido)(tert-butylimido)tantalum(V), (CH_{3})_{3}CNTa(N(C_{2}H_{5})_{2})_{3}	169896-41-7	Reacts violently with water						Tris(diethylamido)(tert-butylimido)tantalum(V), (CH3)3CNTa(N(C2H5)2)3							https://www.sigmaaldrich.com/catalog/product/aldrich/521280?lang=en
Tris(ethylmethylamido)(tert-butylimido)tantalum(V), C_{13}H_{33}N_{4}Ta	511292-99-2	Reacts violently with water						Tris(ethylmethylamido)(tert-butylimido)tantalum(V), C13H33N4Ta							https://www.sigmaaldrich.com/catalog/product/aldrich/j100043?lang=en
Cesium-yttrium tetrakis (1,1,1-trifluoro -5,5-dimethylhexane-2,4-dionate) C32H40O8F12CsY															Vikulova, E. S., Zherikova, K. V., Zelenina, L. N., Trubin, S. V., Sysoev, S. V., Semyannikov, Asanov I. V., Morozova N. B., Igumenov, I. K., J. Chem. Thermodynamics 69 (2014) 137–144
Cesium-yttrium tetrakis (2,2,6,6-tetramethyl-3,5-heptanedionate)			sublimes at 230 °C												A.A. Vorobjev, Course Thesis, http://www.bibliofond.ru/view.aspx?id=555884
Cesium-yttrium tetrakis (hexafluoracetylacetonate) CS[Y(CF3COCHCOCF3)4]															M. J. Bennett, F. A. Cotton, P. Legzdins, S. J. Lippard, Inorg. Chem., 1968, 7 (9), pp 1770–1776,
Cesium-lantanum tetrakis (hexafluoracetylacetonate)															C, E. Higgins, J. Inorg. Nucl. Chem., 1973, Vol 35, Iss. 6p. 1941–1944
Cesium-europium tetrakis (hexafluoracetylacetonate)															[i] C, E. Higgins, J. Inorg. Nucl. Chem., 1973, Vol 35, Iss. 6p. 1941–1944 [ii] J. H. Burns, M. D. Danford, Inorg. Chem., 1969, 8 (8), pp 1780–1784, doi:10.1021/ic50078a048
Rubidium acetylacetonate RbC5H7O2	66169-93-5		melting point: 200 °C												C.R. Bhattacharjee, M. Bhattacharjee; M.K. Chaudhuri, H. Sangchungnunga, J. Chem. Res. Synopses, 1991, no9, pp. 250–251
Rubidium 2,2,6,6-tetramethylheptane-3,5-dionate C11H19O2Rb	166439-15-2	Rb(thd) was found to be completely insoluble in supercritical CO2 (0 mol/L) under these conditions: 100-200bar/ 60 °C													O. Aschenbrenner, S. Kemper, N. Dahmen, K. Schaber, E. Dinjus, J. Supercritical Fluids, 2007, Vol.41, Iss.2, p. 179–186
Rubidium trimethysilyloxide			sublimes at 80 °C/ 10-6 Torr and decomposes at 140 °C												
Rubidium isopropoxide Rb(OiPr)			sublimes under deep vacuum (10-6 Torr) despite its polymeric nature, surprisingly it sublimes at higher temperature (200 °C)												
Rubidium tert-butoxide Rb(OtBu)			sublimable at 185-200 °C/ 10-2 Torr.												M.H. Chisholm, S.R. Drake, A.A. Naiini, W.E. Streib, Polyhedron, 1991, Vol. 10, Iss.3, p. 337–345
Dimethyl aluminum acetylacetonate (CH3)2Al(C5H7O2)															G. A. Battiston, G. Carta, G. Cavinato, R. Gerbasi, M. Porchia G. Rossetto, Chem.Vapor.Dep., 2001, Vol.7, Issue2, Pages 69–74
Diethyl aluminum acetylacetonate															G. A. Battiston, G. Carta, G. Cavinato, R. Gerbasi, M. Porchia G. Rossetto, Chem.Vapor.Dep., 2001, Vol.7, Issue2, Pages 69–74
Diisobutyl aluminum acetylacetonate															G. A. Battiston, G. Carta, G. Cavinato, R. Gerbasi, M. Porchia G. Rossetto, Chem.Vapor.Dep., 2001, Vol.7, Issue2, Pages 69–74
Dimethylamine alane NH(CH3)2 · AlH3															
Trimethylamine alane AlH3 · N(CH3)3	16842-00-5														/www.sigmaaldrich.com/catalog/product/aldrich/455792
Triethylamine alane			Triethylamine alane (TEAA) decomposes on an Al(111) single crystal surface at temperatures above - 310 K												Dubois, L. H., Zegarski, B. R., Gross, M. E., & Nuzzo, R. G. 1991, Surface Science, 244(1-2), 89–95.
Dimethylethylamine alane C2H5N(CH3)2 · AlH3	124330-23-0														www.sigmaaldrich.com/catalog/product/aldrich/400386?lang=it&region=IT
Dimethylaluminum hydride (CH3)2AlH	865-37-2														www.americanelements.com/dimethylaluminum-hydride-865-37-2#:~:text=Dimethylaluminum%20Hydride%20is%20one%20of,portable%20sources%20of%20hydrogen%20gas.
Di-iso-butylaluminum hydride [(CH3)2CHCH2]2AlH	1191-15-7														/www.sigmaaldrich.com/catalog/product/aldrich/190306
Calcium bis(cyclopentadienyl) (calcocene) C10H10Ca	PubChem CID: 100977887														pubchem.ncbi.nlm.nih.gov/compound/Bis_2_4-cyclopentadienyl_-calcium
Calcium bis(isopropylcyclopentadienyl) [(C3H7)3C5H2]2Ca · (CH3OCH2)2															ereztech.com/product/bistri-isopropylcyclopentadienylcalcium-12-dimethoxyethane-adduct-n-a/
calcium bis[bis(trimethylsilyl)amide C12H36CaN2Si4	ChemSpider ID: 9243563														/www.chemspider.com/Chemical-Structure.9243563.html
calcium bis[bis(trimethylsilyl)amide dimethoxyethane															Matthias. Westerhausen, Inorganic Chemistry 1991 30 (1), 96-101
calcium bis[bis(trimethylsilyl)amide tetrahydrofuran															Matthias. Westerhausen, Inorganic Chemistry 1991 30 (1), 96-101
Calcium bis(acetylacetonate) Ca(CH3COCHCOCH3)2	19372-44-2								Melting point >280 °C						www.americanelements.com/calcium-acetylacetonate-19372-44-2
Calcium bis(hexafluoracetylacetonate) tetraglyme															[i] Malandrino, G., Castelli, F., & Fragalà, I. L., Inorganica Chimica Acta, 1994, 224(1-2), 203–207. [ii] D.M. Tsymbarenko et al. / Polyhedron 134 (2017) 246–256
Calcium bis(2,2,6,6-tetramethyl-3,5-heptanedonate) Ca(OCC(CH3)3CHCOC(CH3)3)2	118448-18-3								221-224 °C						www.sigmaaldrich.com/catalog/product/aldrich/362956?lang=it&region=IT
Calcium 1,1,1,2,2,3,3,7,7,8,8,9,9,9-tetradecafluorononane-4,6-dionate monohydrate															Simon C. Thompson, David J. Cole-hamilton, Douglas D. Gilliland, Michael L. Hitchman, John C. Barnes, Advanced Materials for Optics and Electronics, Volume 1, Issue 2, pages 81–97, April 1992
Calcium bis(tert-butyl)dimethylketiminate															El-Kaderi, H. M., Heeg, M. J., & Winter, C. H., Organometallics, 23(21), 2004, 4995–5002.
Calcium bis(isopropyl)dimethylketiminate															El-Kaderi, H. M., Heeg, M. J., & Winter, C. H., Organometallics, 23(21), 2004, 4995–5002.
Chromium (III) 2-ethylhexanoate C24H45CrO6	3444-17-5														www.chemicalbook.com/ChemicalProductProperty_EN_CB5738861.htm
Chromium (III) diethyldithiocarbamate															Sedlacek, J., Martins, L. M. D. R. S., Danek, P., Pombeiro, A. J. L., & Cvek, B., Journal of Applied Biomedicine, 2014, 12(4),
Chromium tris(acetylacetonate) Cr(C5H7O2)3	21679-31-2														www.sigmaaldrich.com/catalog/product/aldrich/574082?lang=it&region=IT
Chromium tris(trifluoroacetylacetonate) Cr(C5H4F3O2)3	14592-89-3														/www.sigmaaldrich.com/catalog/product/aldrich/495697?lang=it&region=IT
Chromium tris(hexafluoroacetylacetonate) Cr(CF3COCHCOCF3)3	14592-80-4														www.americanelements.com/chromium-iii-hexafluoroacetylacetonate-14592-80-4
Chromium tris(2,2,6,6-tetramethyl-3,5-heptanedionate) Cr(OCC(CH3)3CHCOC(CH3)3)3	14434-47-0														www.sigmaaldrich.com/catalog/product/aldrich/468223?lang=it&region=IT
Dysprosium tris(acetylacetonate) Dy(C5H7O2)3• xH2O	18716-76-2														www.americanelements.com/dysprosium-acetylacetonate-18716-76-2#:~:text=Dysprosium%20Acetylacetonate%20is%20one%20of,energy%20and%20water%20treatment%20applications.
Dysprosium tris(2,2,6,6-tetramethyl-3,5-heptanedionate) Dy(C11H19O2)3	15522-69-7														www.americanelements.com/tris-2-2-6-6-tetramethyl-3-5-heptanedionato-dysprosium-iii-15522-69-7
Dysprosium tris(6-ethyl-2,2-dimethyl-3,5-decanedionate) Dy(OCC(CH3)3CHCOCF2CF2CF3)3	18323-98-3														www.sigmaaldrich.com/catalog/product/aldrich/237280?lang=it&region=IT
Dysprosium tris(isopropoxide) Dy(OC3H7)3	6742-68-3														www.americanelements.com/dysprosium-iii-isopropoxide-6742-68-3
Dysprosium tris(1-methoxy-2-methyl-2-propanolate)															Van Elshocht, S., Lehnen, P., Seitzinger, B., Abrutis, A., Adelmann, C., Brijs, B., ... Heyns, M., Journal of The Electrochemical Society, 153(9), 2006
